= List of monarchs of Punjab =

Maharaja of Punjab
- Imperial
- Seal of Ranjit Singh

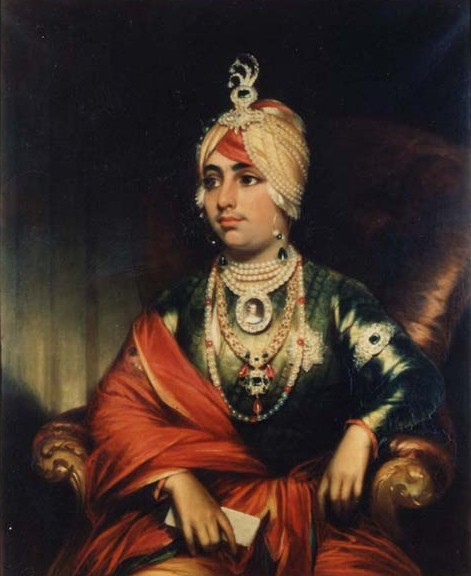
- Last to reign Duleep Singh; 15 September 1843 – 29 March 1849

Details
- Style: List: Maharajadhiraja; Maharaja; Sultan; Raja; Nawab
- First monarch: Udayana 6th century – 5th century BC (first known ruler)
- Last monarch: Duleep Singh 1843–1849 (as Maharaja of Punjab)
- Formed: Vedic period
- Residences: List: Sagala; Taxila; Multan; Lahore; Aror
- Appointer: Hereditary

The monarchs of Punjab were the rulers of various kingdoms and republics of the Punjab beginning with the Vedic period and ending after the British empire. Much of native Punjab during the ancient period was ruled by various Tribal republics, such as the Yaudheyas, Madra, Trigarta, Audumbara, Oxydrakoi, Malloi and Gandhara with their leaders and monarchs being largely unknown.

The Ancient Period of Punjab saw the earliest known monarchs date back to the Vedic period. During the early to mid-6th century BCE, Taxila was ruled by King Pukkusati, who was a contemporary of the Achaemenid rulers. However, details regarding subsequent monarchs remain largely unrecorded until the Macedonian invasion of Punjab in the 5th century BCE. Following the death of Alexander the Great, monarchical power shifted to the Mauryan Empire in the 4th century BCE. In the 2nd century BCE, the Indo-Greek kings took over, followed by the Indo-Scythians and Indo-Parthians in the 1st century BCE. These dynasties ruled alongside native dynasties such as the Apracharajas. By the time of Apollonius’ travels through Punjab, power had largely returned to native rulers. The Kushan Empire's monarchs ruled Punjab, but by the 3rd century CE, control passed to the Gadahara and Shilada dynasties. Their rule was eventually disrupted by the Hunnic invasions in the 4th century CE.

The medieval period of Punjab saw the Eastern Punjab come under the rule of the Vardhana dynasty in the 7th century CE, while the Western Punjab was governed by the Taank Kingdom. By the 8th century, the Chach dynasty of Aror was ruling most of the Western Punjab. In the 9th century, the Hindu Shahi dynasty emerged as the rulers, until the Ghaznavids assumed monarchical control in the 11th century. Power then shifted to the Ghorid dynasty, until Muhammad Ghori 's assassination by the House of the Khokhars, paving the way for the establishment of the Delhi Sultanate in the 13th century.

The early modern period in the 16th century saw the rise of the Mughal Empire, which incorporated Punjab, though governance in the region was largely managed by various Sikh misls. Later, Adina Beg emerged as the ruler of Punjab. Following his death, the Sikh Empire consolidated power, ruling the region until the British conquest. During British rule, Punjab was divided into multiple territories, with certain regions governed by princely states.

== Pauravas ==
- Porus (before 326 BC, probably 338 BC – between 321 and 315 BC)

== Macedonian Empire (326 – 316 BC) ==
The Macedonian Empire at its greatest extent

Name	Reign	Succession	Life details
Alexander III "the Great"	326 – 323 (3 years)	Son of Philip II	356 – 10/11 June 323 (aged 33) Conquered the entirety of the Persian Empire; died of illness at Babylon

== Maurya Empire (322 – 184 BC) ==
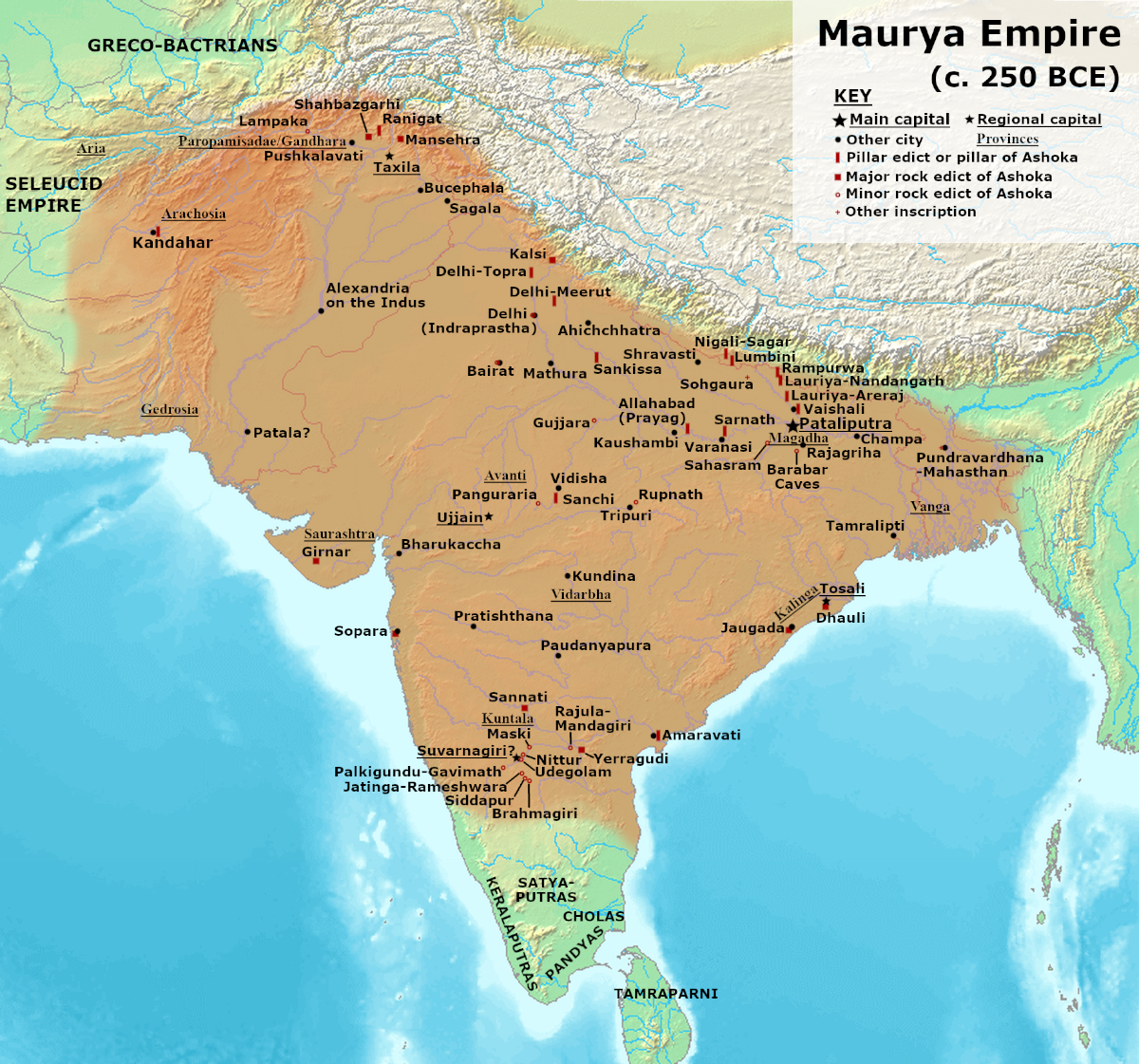
The Maurya Empire at its greatest extent

Ruler	Reign	Notes
Chandragupta Maurya	322–297 BCE	Founder of first Indian united empire.
Bindusara	297–273 BCE	Known for his foreign diplomacy and crushed of Vidarbha revolt.
Ashoka	268–232 BCE	Greatest emperor of dynasty. His son Kunala was blinded and died before his father. Ashoka was succeeded by his grandson. Also known for Kalinga War victory.
Dasharatha Maurya	232–224 BCE	Grandson of Ashoka.
Samprati	224–215 BCE	Brother of Dasharatha.
Shalishuka	215–202 BCE	
Devavarman	202–195 BCE	
Shatadhanvan	195–187 BCE	The Mauryan Empire had shrunk by the time of his reign
Brihadratha	187–184 BCE	Assassinated by his Commander-in-chief Pushyamitra Shunga in 185 BCE.

== Indo-Greeks (200 – 20 BC) ==
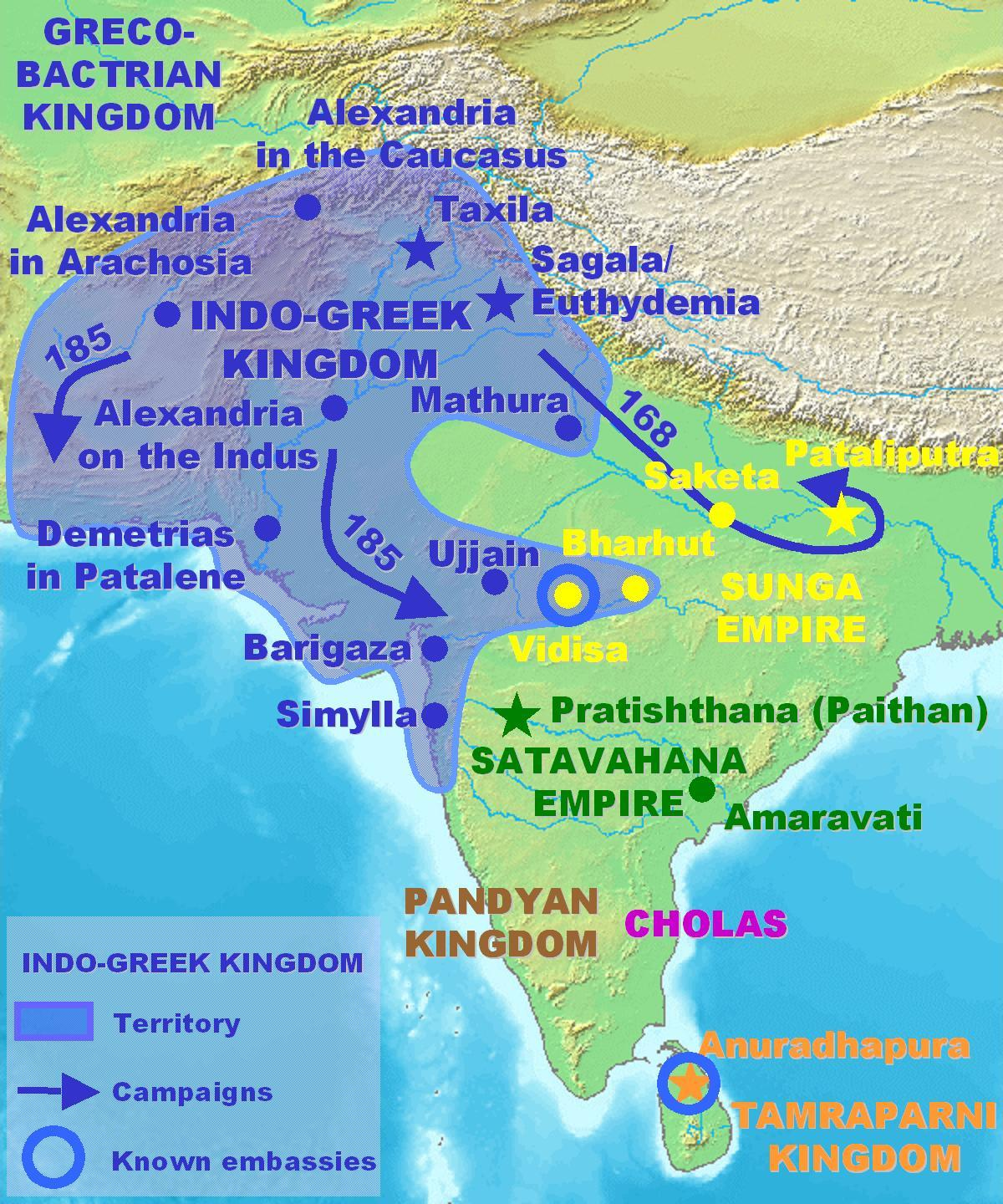
map of Indo-Greeks and their expansion into India

Greco-Bactrian and Indo-Greek kings, their coins, territories and chronology Based on Bopearachchi (1991)
	Greco-Bactrian kings		Indo-Greek kings					
Territories/ dates	West Bactria	East Bactria	Paropamisade	Arachosia	Gandhara	Western Punjab	Eastern Punjab	Mathura
200–190 BC	Demetrius I							
190–185 BC	Euthydemus II							
190–180 BC	Agathocles			Pantaleon				
185–170 BC	Antimachus I							
180–160 BC			Apollodotus I					
175–170 BC	Demetrius II							
160–155 BC			Antimachus II					
170–145 BC	Eucratides							
155–130 BC	Yuezhi occupation, loss of Ai-Khanoum	Eucratides II Plato Heliocles I	Menander I					
130–120 BC	Yuezhi occupation		Zoilos I		Agathokleia			Yavanarajya inscription
120–110 BC			Lysias		Strato I			Yavanarajya inscription
110–100 BC			Antialcidas		Heliokles II			Yavanarajya inscription
100 BC			Polyxenos		Demetrius III			Yavanarajya inscription
100–95 BC			Philoxenus					Yavanarajya inscription
95–90 BC			Diomedes	Amyntas		Epander		Yavanarajya inscription
90 BC			Theophilos	Peukolaos		Thraso		Yavanarajya inscription
90–85 BC			Nicias	Menander II		Artemidoros		Yavanarajya inscription
90–70 BC			Hermaeus	Archebius				Yavanarajya inscription
			Yuezhi occupation		Maues (Indo-Scythian)			
75–70 BC					Telephos	Apollodotus II		
65–55 BC						Hippostratos	Dionysios	
55–35 BC						Azes I (Indo-Scythian)	Zoilos II	
55–35 BC							Apollophanes	
25 BC – AD 10							Strato II and Strato III	
							Zoilos III/ Bhadayasa	
							Rajuvula (Indo-Scythian)	

== Northern Satraps ==
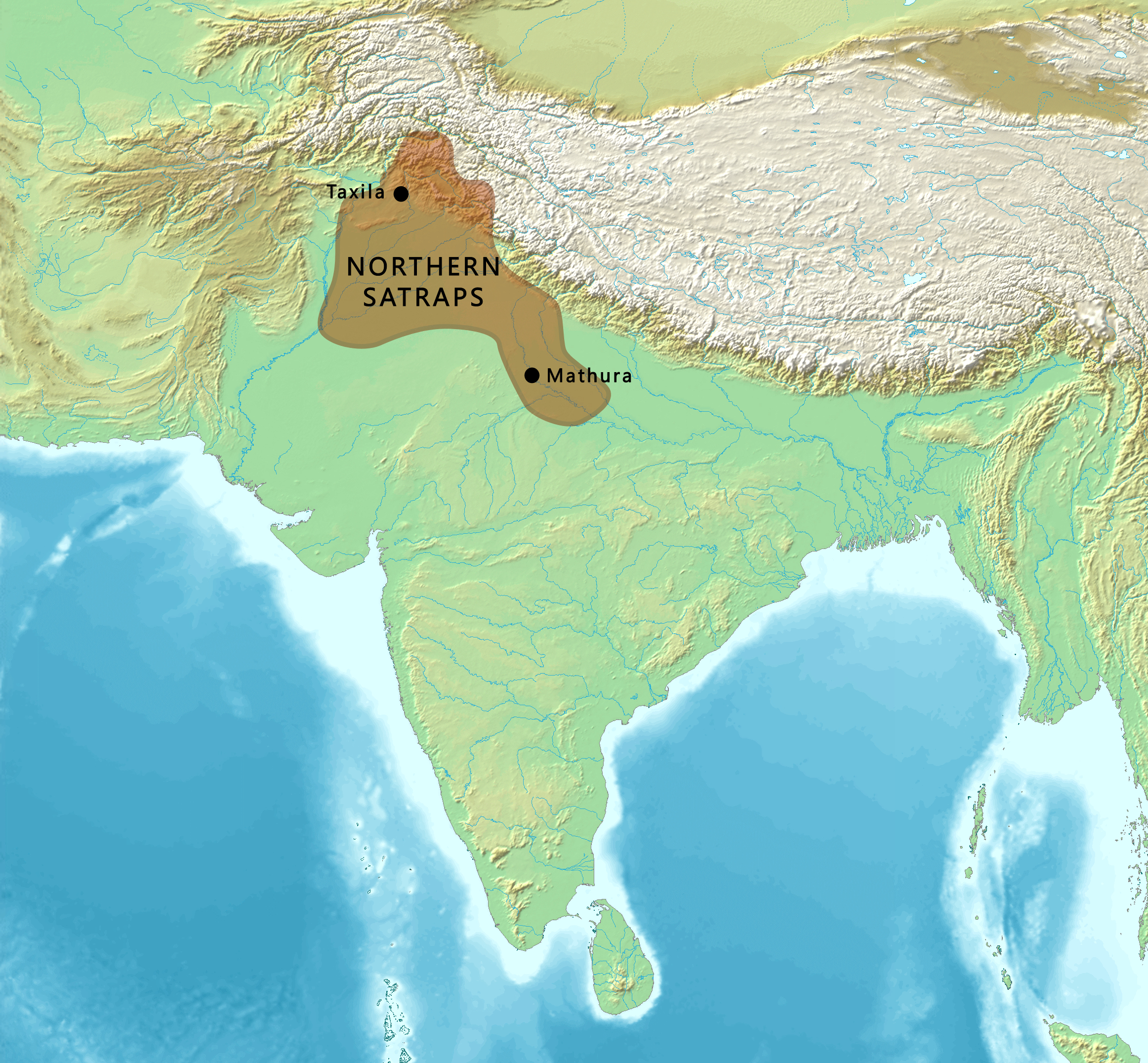
Northern Satraps in early 1st century

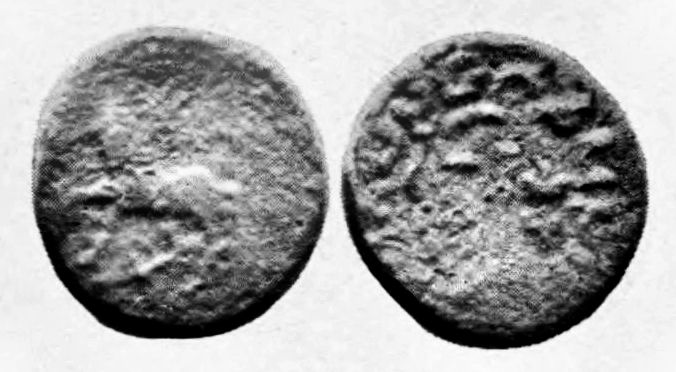
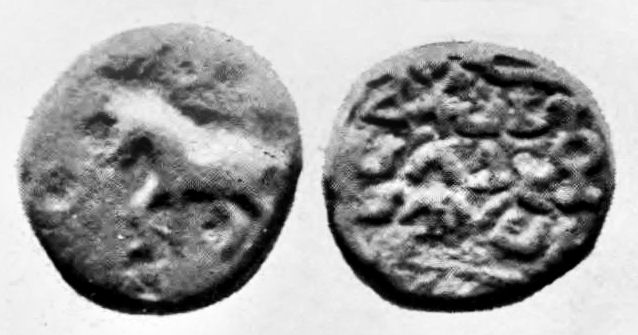
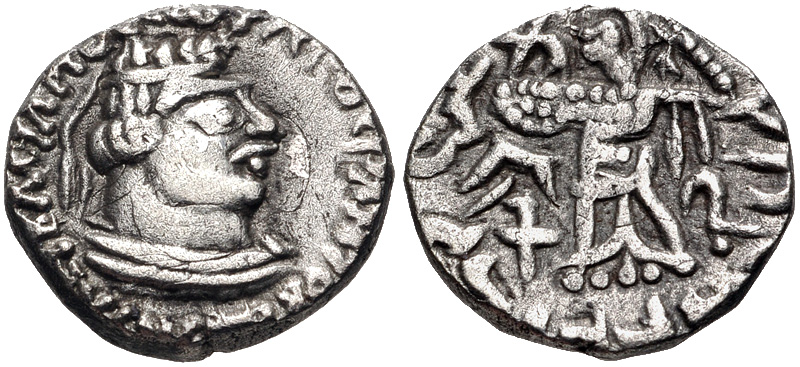
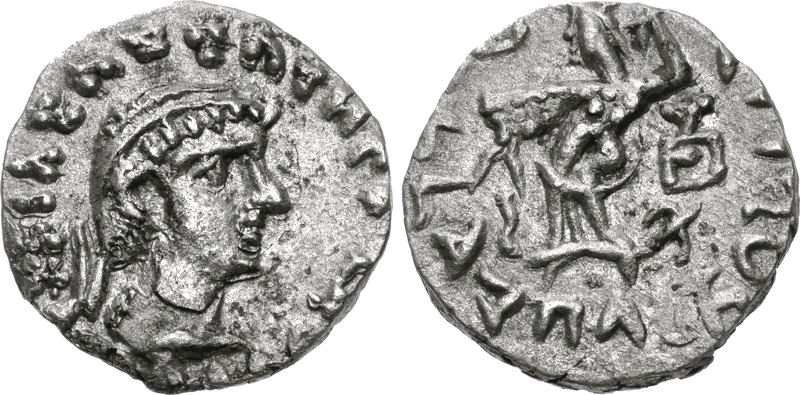
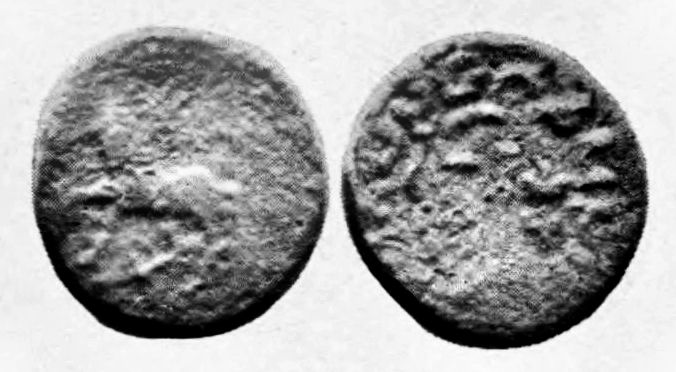
Ruler	Image	Title	Approx. dates	Mentions
Hagamasha		Satrap	1st century BCE	In the archaeological excavations of Sonkh, near Mathura, the earliest coins of the Kshatrapa levels were those of Hagamasha.
Hagana		Satrap	1st century BCE
Rajuvula		Great Satrap	early 1st century BCE
Bhadayasa		Satrap	1st century CE	Possible successor of Rajuvula in Eastern Punjab
Sodasa		Satrap	1st century CE	Son of Rajuvula in Mathura
Kharapallana	Ksatrapena Vanasparena Kharapallanena	Great Satrap	c. CE 130	Great Satrap for Kushan ruler Kanishka I
Vanaspara	Ksatrapena Vanasparena Kharapallanena	Satrap	c. CE 130	Satrap for Kushan ruler Kanishka I

== Indo-Parthians (15 BC – 50 AD) ==
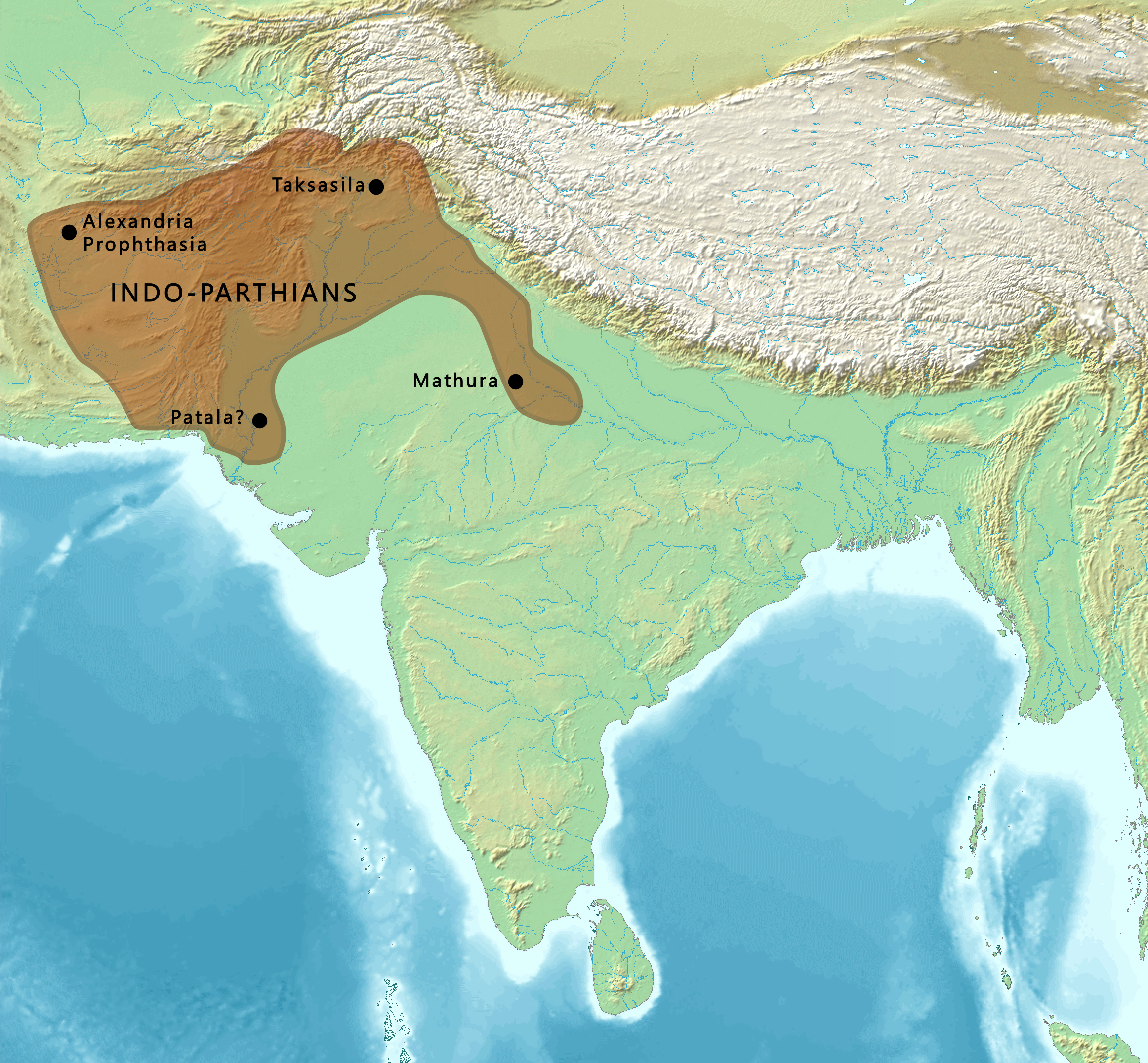
Indo-Parthians at their greatest extent, c. 40 CE

- Gondophares I (c. 19 – 46) Coin
- Abdagases I (first years AD – mid-1st century AD) Coin
- Gondophares IV Sases, (mid-1st century AD)

== Kushan Empire (50 – 350 AD) ==
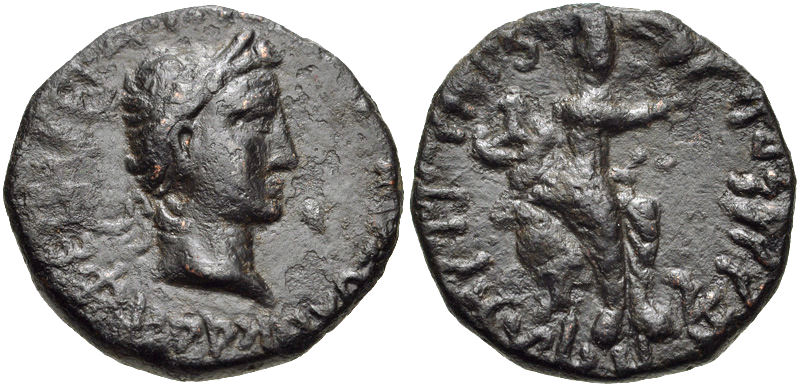
- Kujula Kadphises (c. 50 – c. 90)
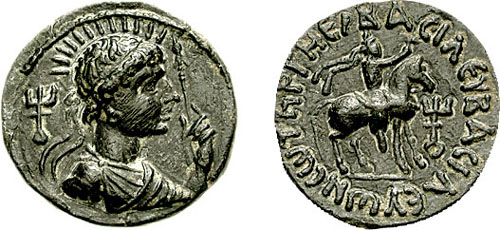
- Vima Takto (c. 90 – c. 113), alias Soter Megas or "Great Saviour."
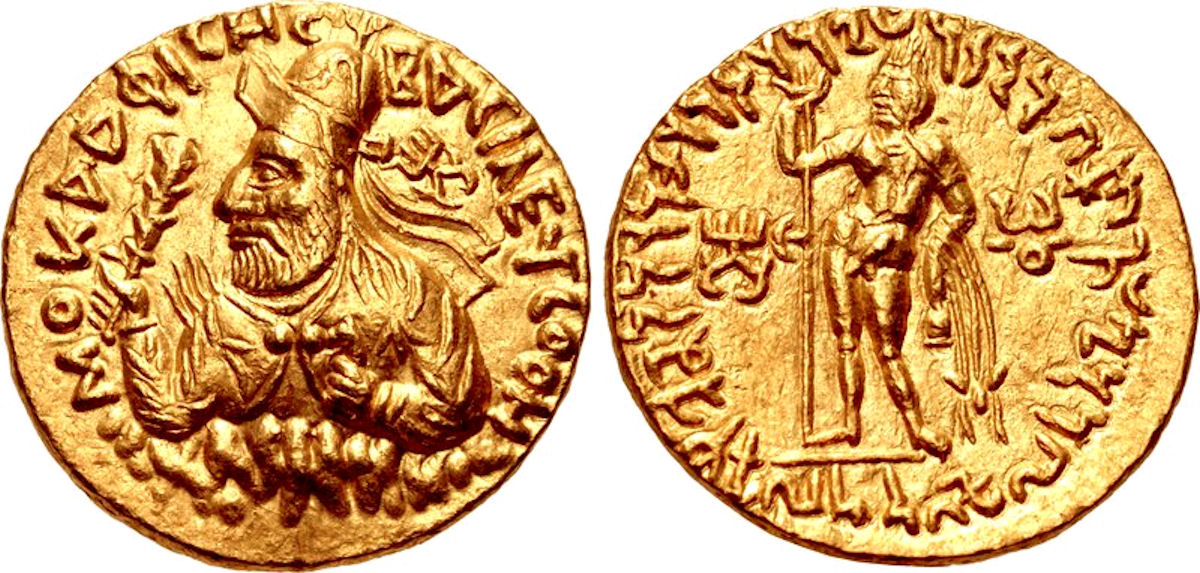
- Vima Kadphises (c. 113 – c. 127) First great Kushan Emperor
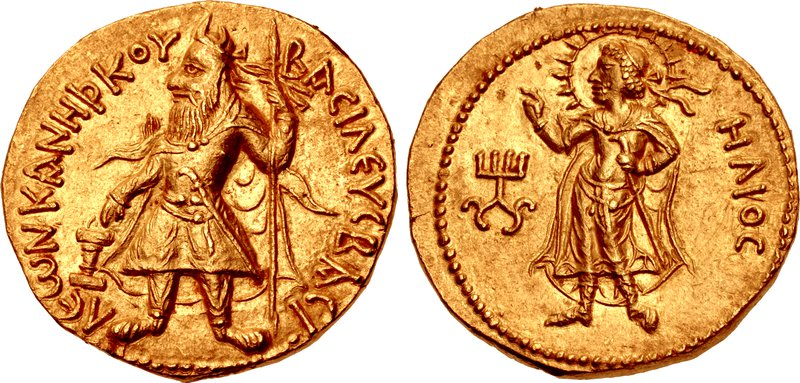
- Kanishka the Great (127 – c. 151)
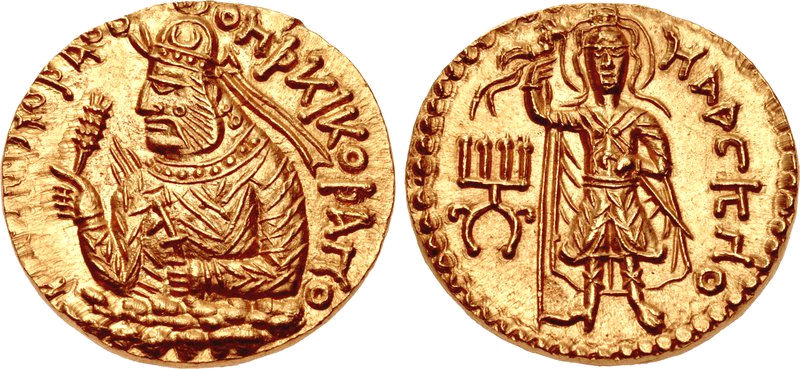
- Huvishka (c. 151 – c. 190)
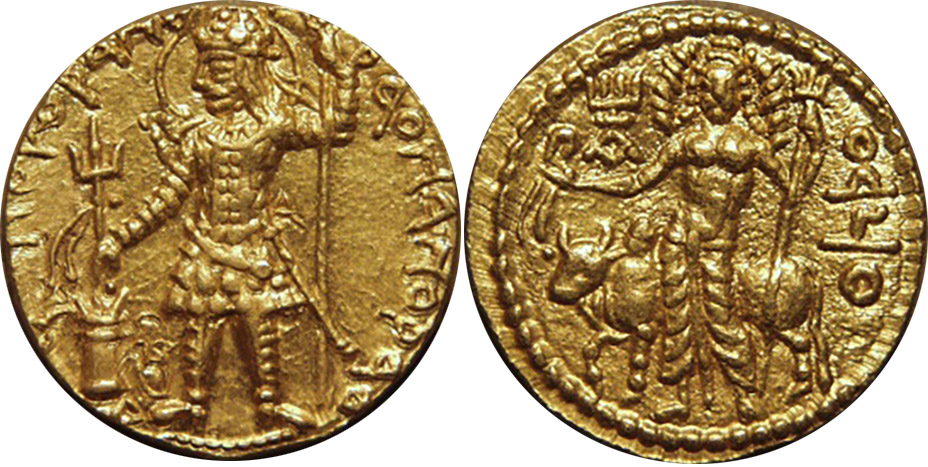
- Vasudeva I (c. 190 – c. 230) Last great Kushan Emperor
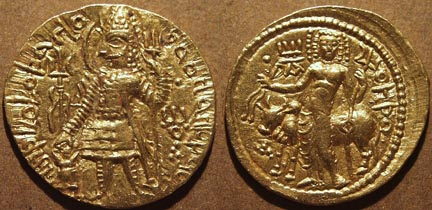
- Kanishka II (c. 230 – 247)
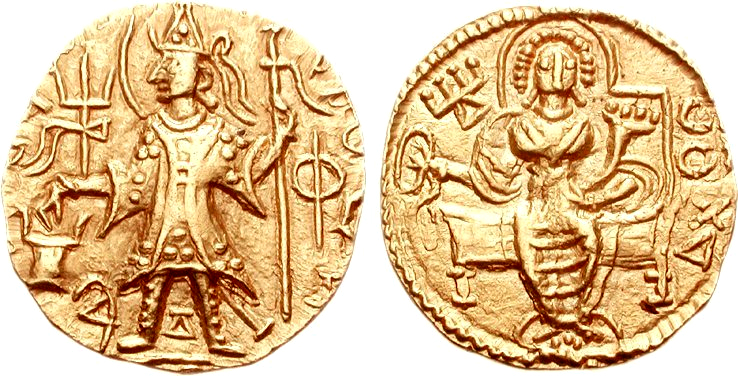
- Vashishka (c. 247 – 267)

"Little Kushans";

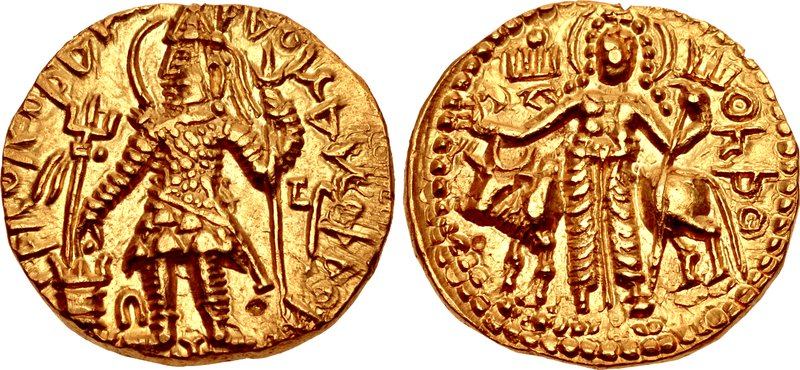
- Kanishka III (c. 267 – 270)
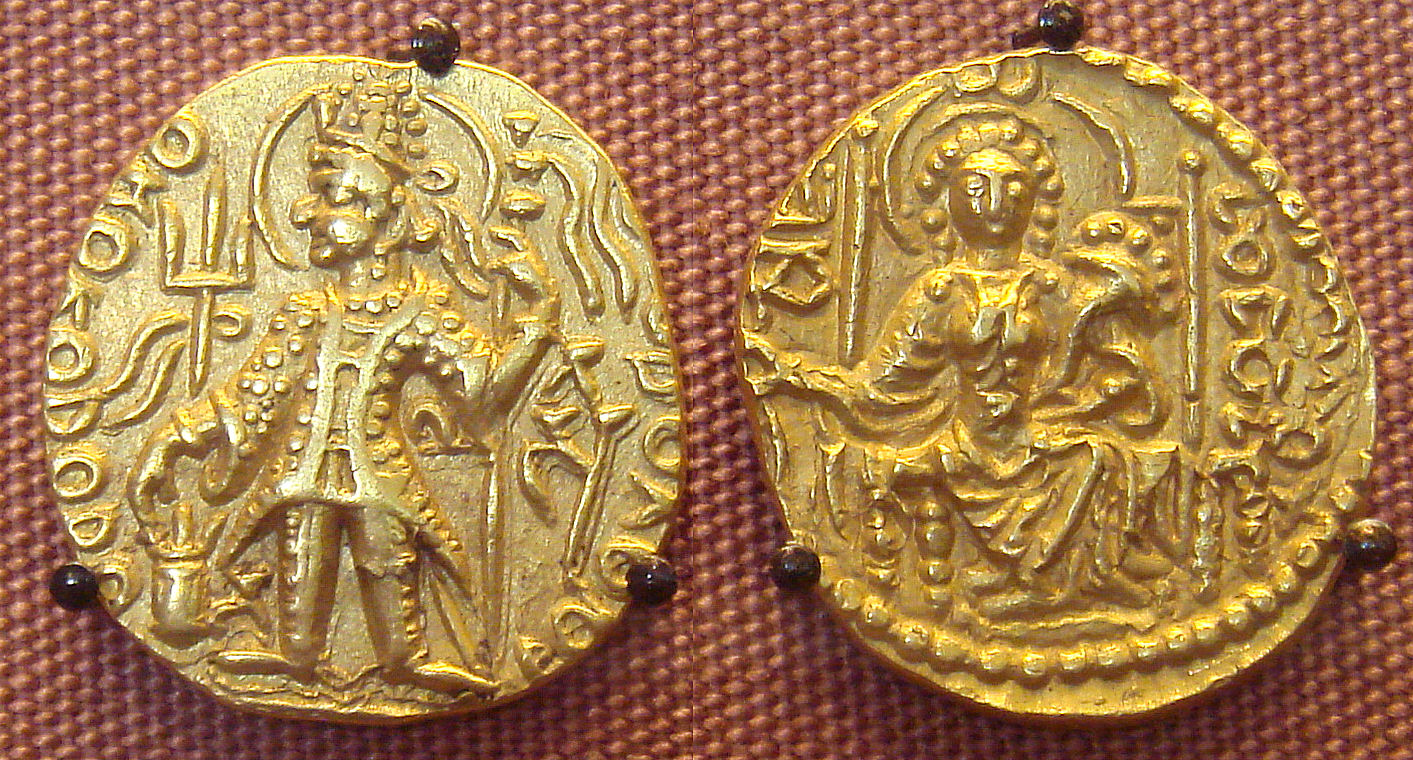
- Vasudeva II (c. 270 – 300)
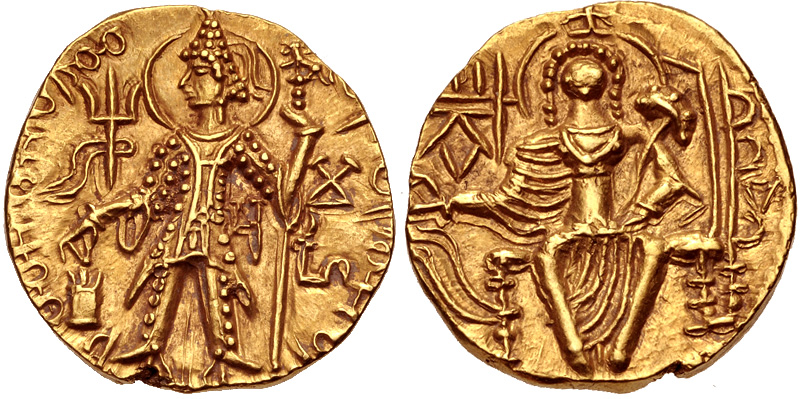
- Mahi (c. 300 – 305)
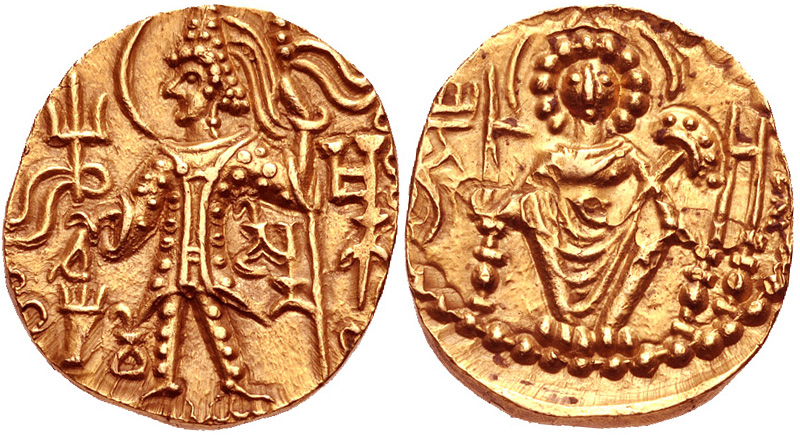
- Shaka (c. 305 – 335)
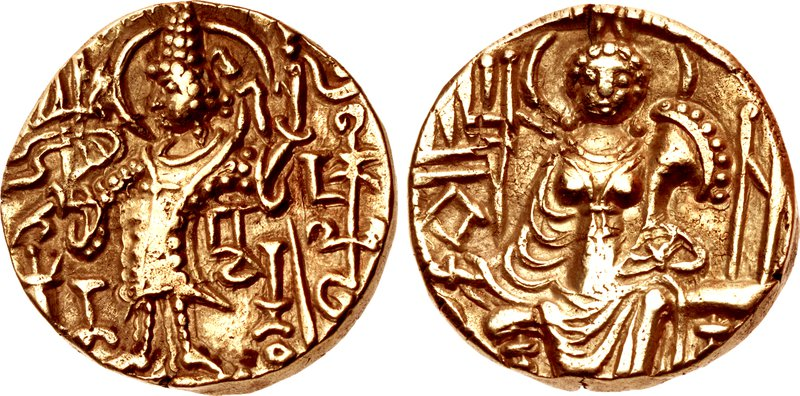
- Kipunada (c. 335 – 350)

Territories/ dates	Western India	Western Pakistan Balochistan	Paropamisadae Arachosia	Bajaur	Gandhara	Western Punjab	Eastern Punjab	Mathura	Pataliputra
				INDO-SCYTHIAN KINGDOM			INDO-GREEK KINGDOM	INDO-SCYTHIAN Northern Satraps	
25 BCE – 10 CE				Indo-Scythian dynasty of the APRACHARAJAS; Vijayamitra (ruled 12 BCE – 15 CE) (Note: From the dated inscription on the Rukhana reliquary)	Liaka Kusulaka; Patika Kusulaka; Zeionises	Kharahostes (ruled 10 BCE– 10 CE); Mujatria	Strato II and Strato III	Hagana	
10-20CE		INDO-PARTHIAN KINGDOM; Gondophares		Indravasu	INDO-PARTHIAN KINGDOM; Gondophares		Rajuvula		
20–30 CE			Ubouzanes; Pakores	Vispavarma (ruled c. 0–20 CE)	Sarpedones		Bhadayasa	Sodasa	
30-40 CE			KUSHAN EMPIRE; Kujula Kadphises (c. 50–90)	Indravarma	Abdagases		...	...	
40–45 CE				Aspavarma	Gadana		...	...	
45–50 CE				Sasan	Sases		...	...	
50–75 CE							...	...	
75–100 CE	Indo-Scythian dynasty of the WESTERN SATRAPS; Chastana		Vima Takto (c. 90–113)				...	...	
100–120 CE	Abhiraka		Vima Kadphises (c. 113–127)						
120 CE	Bhumaka; Nahapana	PARATARAJAS; Yolamira	Kanishka I (c. 127–151)				Great Satrap Kharapallana and Satrap Vanaspara for Kanishka I		
130–230 CE	Jayadaman; Rudradaman I Damajadasri I Jivadaman; Rudrasimha I Isvaradatta; Rudrasimha I Jivadaman; Rudrasena I	Bagamira; Arjuna; Hvaramira; Mirahvara	Huvishka (c. 151 – c. 190); Vasudeva I (c. 190 – 230)						
230–250 CE	Samghadaman; Damasena; Damajadasri II; Viradaman; Yasodaman I Vijayasena; Damajadasri III; Rudrasena II; Visvasimha	Miratakhma; Kozana; Bhimarjuna; Koziya; Datarvharna; Datarvharna	KUSHANO-SASANIANS; Ardashir I (c. 230 – 250); Ardashir II (?-245)	Kanishka II (c. 230 – 247)					
250–280	Samghadaman; Damasena; Damajadasri II; Viradaman; Yasodaman I Vijayasena; Damajadasri III; Rudrasena II; Visvasimha	Miratakhma; Kozana; Bhimarjuna; Koziya; Datarvharna; Datarvharna	Peroz I, "Kushanshah" (c. 250 – 265); Hormizd I, "Kushanshah" (c. 265 – 295)			Vāsishka (c. 247 – 267); Kanishka III (c. 267 – 270)			
280–300	Bhratadarman	Datayola II	Hormizd II, "Kushanshah" (c. 295 – 300)			Vasudeva II (c. 267 – 300)		GUPTA EMPIRE; Chandragupta I Samudragupta; Chandragupta II	
300–320 CE	Visvasena; Rudrasimha II; Jivadaman		Peroz II, "Kushanshah" (c. 300 – 325)			Mahi (c. 300–305); Shaka (c. 305 – 335)		GUPTA EMPIRE; Chandragupta I Samudragupta; Chandragupta II	
320–388 CE	Yasodaman II; Rudradaman II; Rudrasena III; Simhasena; Rudrasena IV		Varahran I (325–350); Shapur II Sassanid king and "Kushanshah" (c. 350)			Kipunada (c. 335 – 350)		GUPTA EMPIRE; Chandragupta I Samudragupta; Chandragupta II	
388–396 CE	Rudrasimha III		KIDARITES invasion					GUPTA EMPIRE; Chandragupta I Samudragupta; Chandragupta II	

== Huns (390 – 550 AD) ==
=== Kidarite Huns (390 - 455 AD) ===
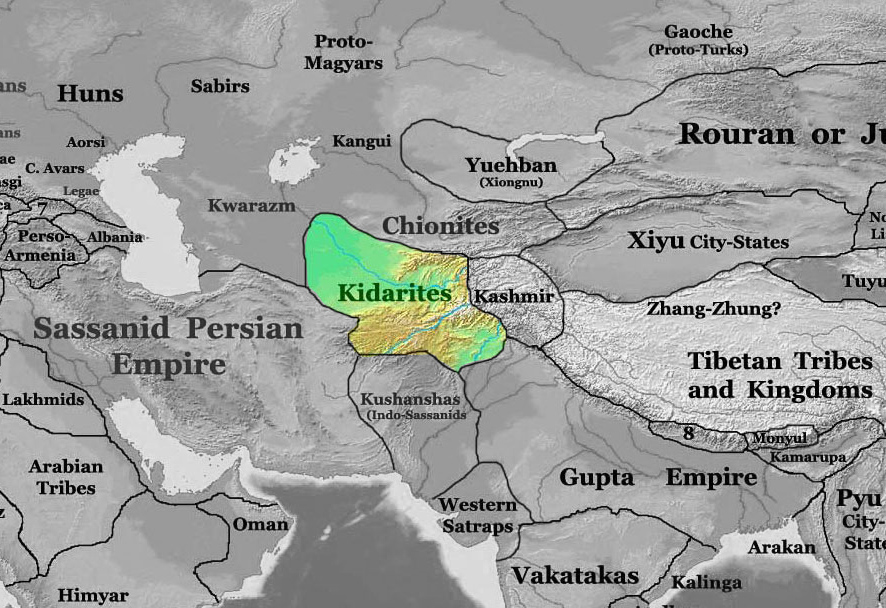
Kidarite Huns at their greatest extent, c. 400 AD

Yosada	c.335 CE
(Unknown)	fl. 388/400
Varhran (II)	fl. c. 425
Goboziko	fl. c. 450

=== Alchon Huns (470 – 550 AD) ===
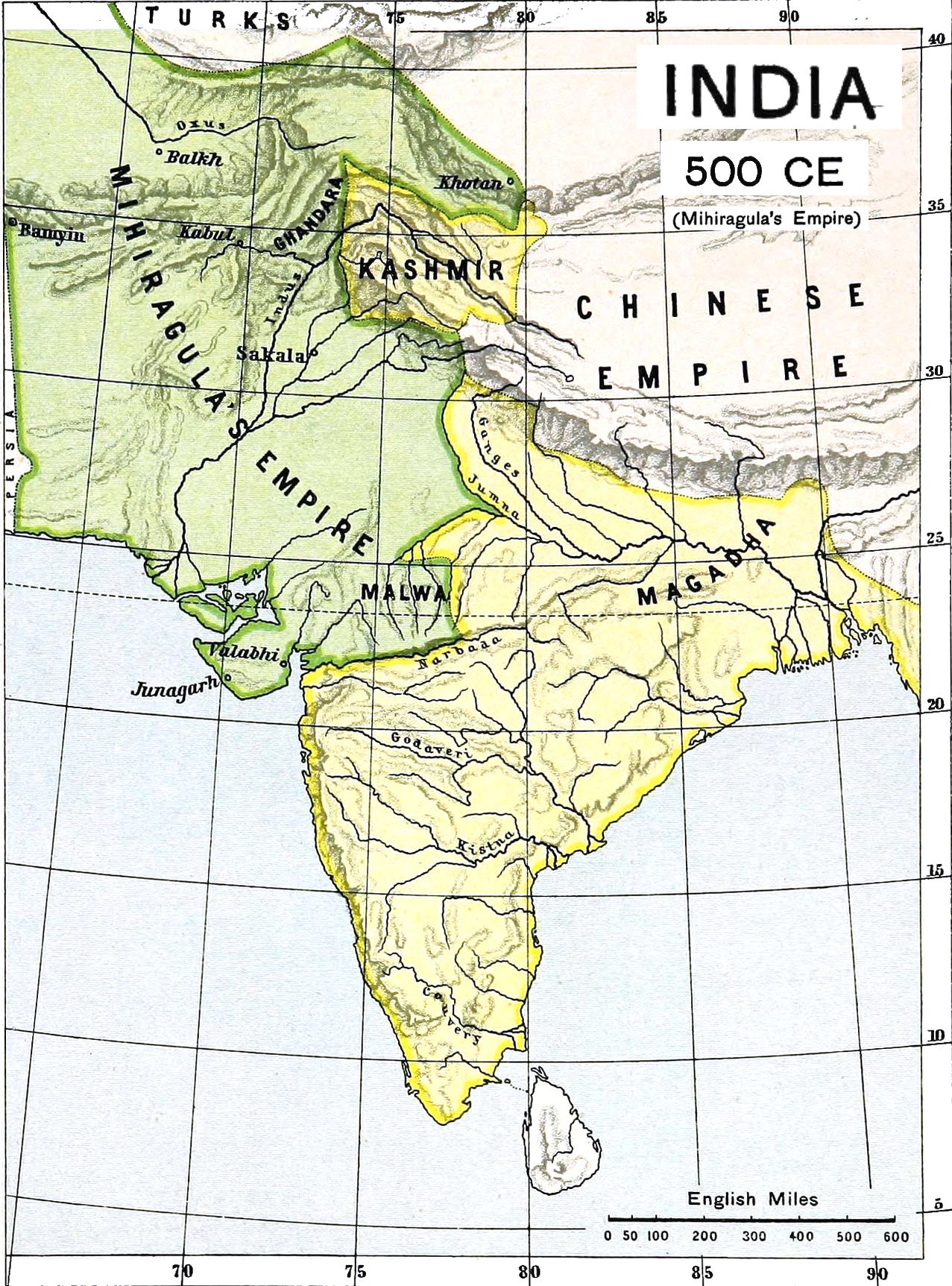
Alchon Huns at their greatest extent under Mihirakula, c. 500 CE

- Toramana (c. 470 – 515 CE)
- Mihirakula (c. 515 – 540 CE)
- Toramana II (c. 530 – 550 CE)

== Taank Kingdom (550 – 822) ==
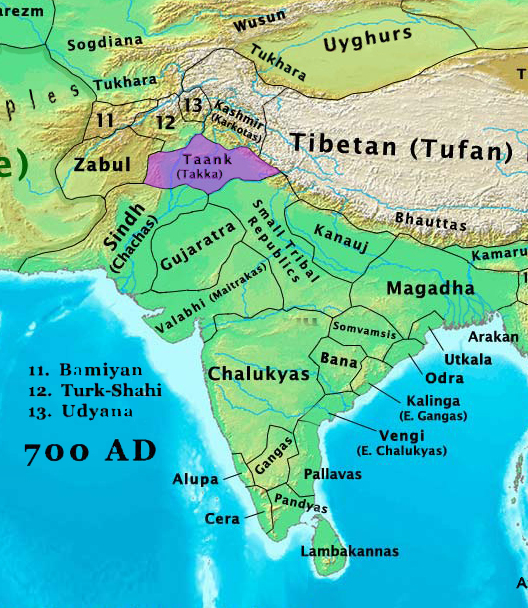
Taank Kingdom (in purple) alongside other South Asian polities, c. 700 AD

The Taanks (Takkas) were people from a variety of clans forming a kingdom. The rulers of the kingdom are only known from sources of chronicles and minted coins. During this rule (630 AD), Lahore was said to have been visited by the Chinese pilgrim Hieun Tsang. He described it as a great Brahmin city.

Note: Not listed chronologically.

- Ratapat
- Bahurpal
- Sahajpal
- Madanpal

== Brahmin dynasty (632 – 712) ==
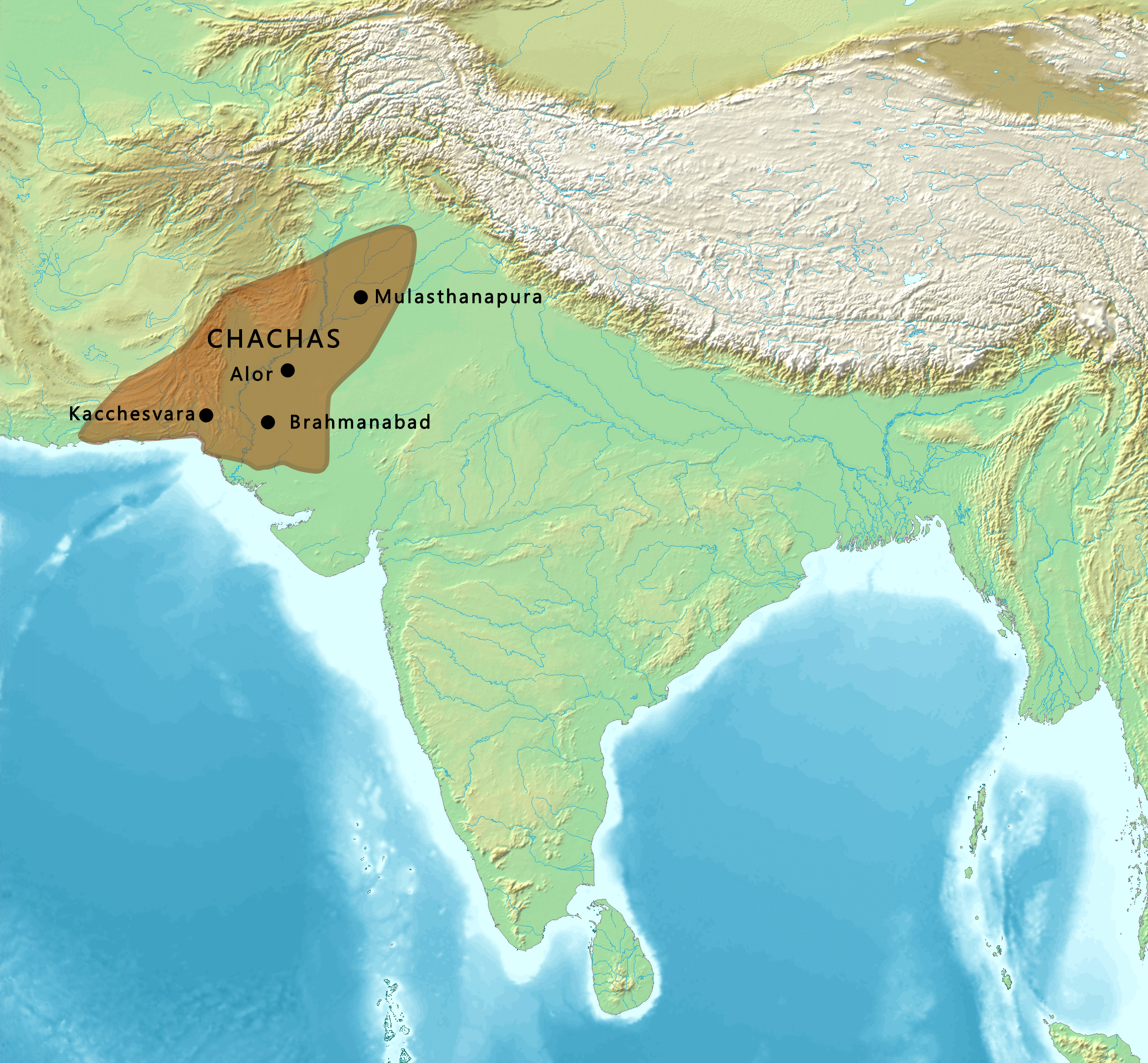
Brahmin (Chacha) dynasty at its greatest extent

- Chach (r. c. 632 – c. 671– )
- Chandar (r. c. 671 – c. 679– )
- Dāhir (r. c. 679 – c. 712– from Alor)

== Hindu Shahi Kingdom (822 – 1026) ==
Ruler	Reign	Notes
Kallar	c. 843 CE	Founder of the Hindu Shahi dynasty
Samanta	c. 850 CE	
Lalliya	c. 880 CE	Shifted capital to Udabhanda and defeated the Saffarid dynasty
Toramana	c. 903 CE	
Bhimadeva	c. 921 CE	Alliance with the Lohara dynasty and defeated the Samanid Empire
Jayapala	c. 964 CE	Resisted the Ghaznavids but committed suicide via Sati
Anandapala	c. 1002 CE	Conquered Lahore but unsuccessfully resisted the Ghaznavids
Trilocanapala	c. 1010 CE	
Bhimapala	c. 1021 CE	Last Hindu Shahi monarch

== Emirate of Multan (855 – 1010) ==
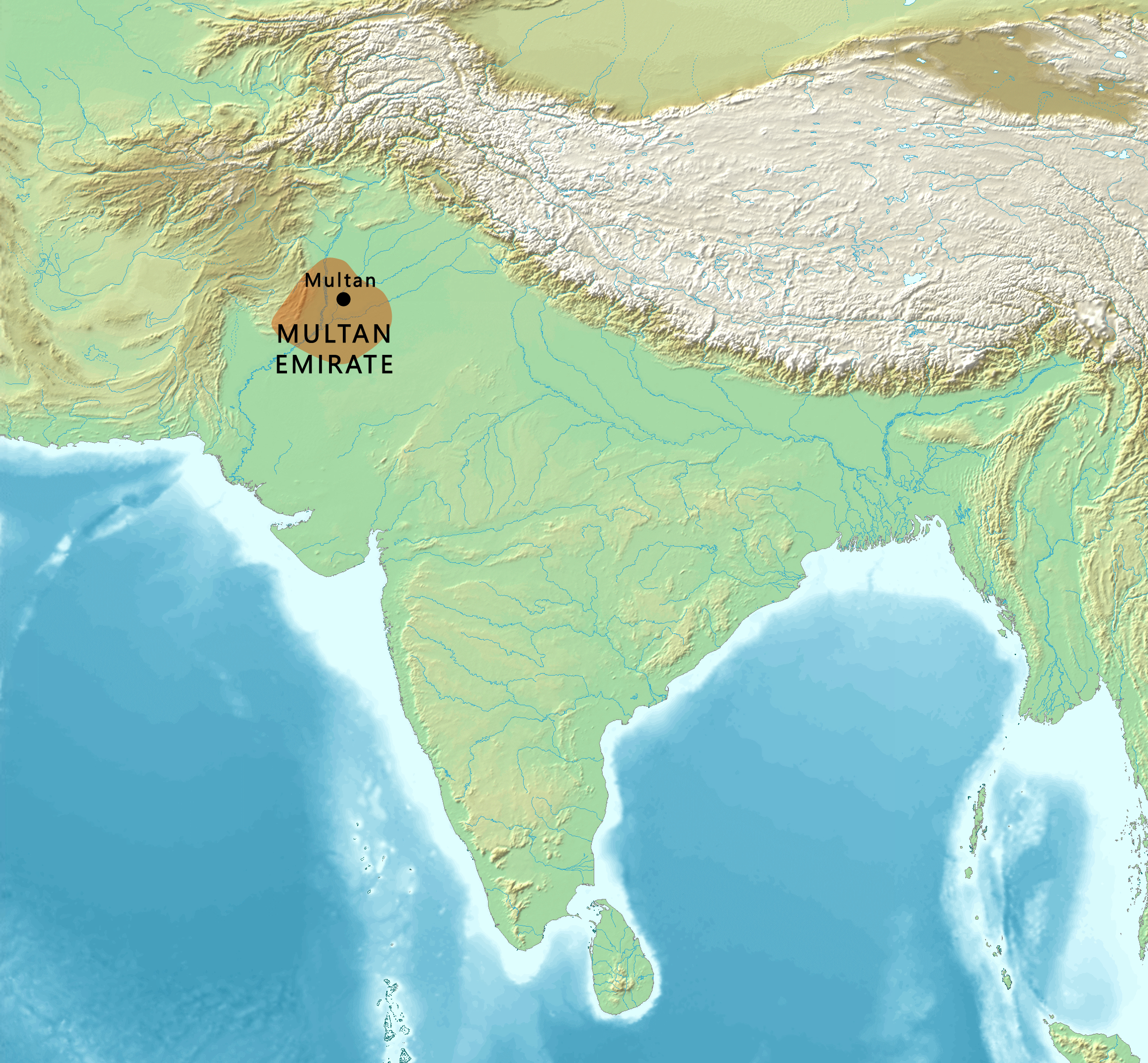
Emirate of Multan centered around the city of Multan

=== Munnabih dynasty (855 – 959) ===
- Muhammad Munabbih III (855 – 864)
- Asad Qureshi (892 – early 900s, probably 918)
- Hassan II (late 800s)
- Ahmed II (late 800s – early 900s)
- Munabbih I (912 – 913)
- Muhammad Munabbih IV (913 – 920)
- Munabbih II (920 – 930)
- Fahad Munabbih (930 – 940)
- Harun Munabbih (940 – 959)

=== Lodi dynasty (959 – 1010) ===
- Jalam bin Shayban (959 – 985)
- Hamid ibn Shayban (985 – 997)
- Nasr ibn Hamid (997 – ??)
- Abul Fateh Daud ibn Nasr (?? – 1010)

== Ghaznavid Empire (1010 – 1186) ==
Map of the Ghaznavid dynasty at its greatest extent

#	Laqab	Personal Name	Reign	Succession right	Notes
1	Yamin ad-Dawlah Abu Qasim یمین الدولہ ابو لقاسم; Right-hand man of the State	Mahmud	1010–1030	first son of Sabuktigin	
2	Jalal ad-Dawlah جلال الدولہ; Dignity of the State	Muhammad	1030; 1st reign	second son of Mahmud	
3	Shihab ad-Dawlah شھاب الدولہ; Star of the State	Masud I	1030–1041	first son of Mahmud	Was overthrown, imprisoned and executed, following the battle of Dandanaqan
—	Jalal ad-Dawlah جلال الدولہ; Dignity of the State	Muhammad	1041; 2nd reign	second son of Mahmud	Raised to the throne following the removal of Masud I.
4	Shihab ad-Dawlah شھاب الدولہ; Star of the State	Mawdud	1041–1048	son of Masud I	Defeated Muhammad at the battle of Nangrahar and gained the throne.
5	? ?	Masud II	1048	son of Mawdud	
6	Baha ad-Dawlah بھاء الدولہ; Splendor of the State	Ali	1048–1049	son of Masud I	
7	Izz ad-Dawlah عز الدولہ; Glory of the State	Abd al-Rashid	1049–1052	fifth son of Mahmud	
8	Qiwam ad-Dawlah قوام الدولہ; Support of the State	Toghrul	1052–1053	Turkish mamluk general	Usurped the Ghaznavid throne after massacring Abd al-Rashid and eleven other Ghaznavid princes.
9	Jamal ad-Dawlah جمال الدولہ; Beauty of the state	Farrukh-Zad	1053–1059	son of Masud I	
10	Zahir ad-Dawlah ظھیر الدولہ; Help of the State	Ibrahim	1059–1099	son of Masud I	
13	Ala ad-Dawlah علاء الدولہ; Blessing of the State	Mas'ūd III	1099–1115	son of Ibrahim	
11	Kamal ad-Dawlah کمال الدولہ; Perfection of the State	Shir-Zad	1115–1116	son of Masud III	Murdered by his younger brother Arslan ibn Mas'ud.
12	Sultan ad-Dawlah سلطان الدولہ; Sultan of the state	Arslan-Shah	1116–1117	son of Masud III	Took the throne from his older brother Shirzad, but faced a rebellion from his other brother Bahram Shah, who was supported by the sultan of the Great Seljuq Empire, Ahmad Sanjar.
13	Yamin ad-Dawlah یمین الدولہ; Right-hand man of the state	Bahram Shah	1117–1157	son of Masud III	Under Bahram-Shah, the Ghaznavid empire became a tributary of the Great Seljuq Empire. Bahram was assisted by Ahmad Sanjar, sultan of the Great Seljuq empire, in securing his throne.
14	Muizz ad-Dawlah معزالدولہ; Honor of the State	Khusrau Shah	1157–1160	son of Bahram-Shah	
15	Taj ad-Dawlah تاج الدولہ; Crown of the state	Khusrau Malik	1160–1186	son of Khusrau-Shah	

== Ghurid Empire (1186 – 1206) ==
Map of the Ghurid dynasty at its greatest extent by the year 1202

Coinage	Titular Name(s)	Personal Name	Reign
Coin of Mu'izz al-Din Muhammad, AH 599–602 1171–1206 CE Indian coinage (Pagoda) of Mu'izz al-Din Muhammad. Obverse: Lakshmi seated facing. Reverse: śri maha/[mi]ra mahama/da sama in Devanagari.	Sultan Shahāb-ud-din Muhammad Ghori سلطان شهاب‌ الدین محمد غوری	Mu'izz al-Din Muhammad معز الدین محمد	1173–1206

== Delhi Sultanate (1206 – 1526) ==
=== Mamluk dynasty (1206 – 1290) ===
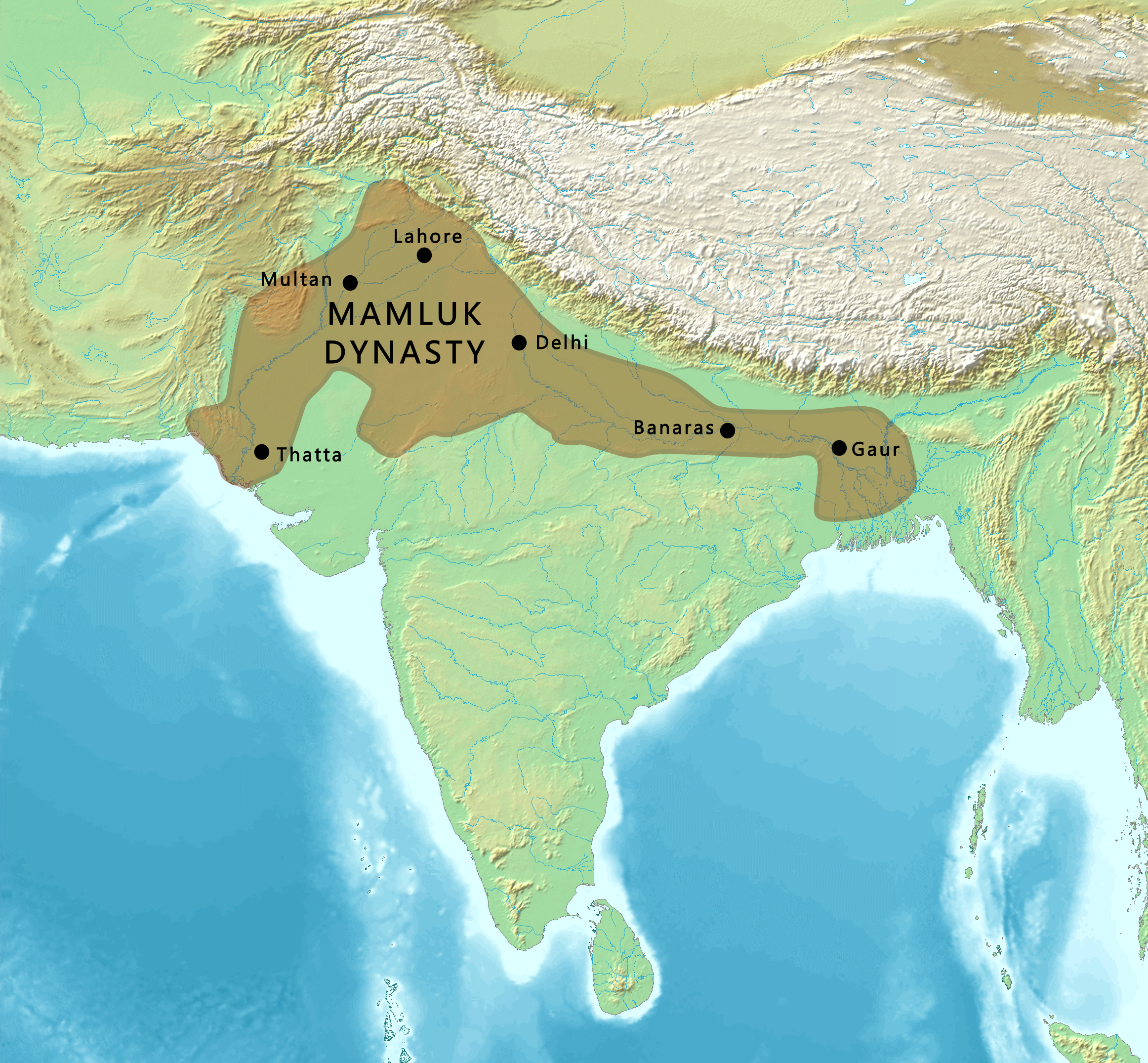
Delhi Sultanate under Mamluk dynasty

S/N	Name of ruler	Birth Date	Death Date	Beginning of reign	End of reign	Notes
1	Qutbuddin Aibak	1150	14 November 1210	25 June 1206	14 November 1210	
2	Aram Shah	unknown	June 1211	December 1210	June 1211	Son of Aibak
3	Iltutmish	unknown	30 April 1236	June 1211	30 April 1236	Son-in-law of Aibak
4	Ruknuddin Firuz (Firuz I)	unknown	19 November 1236	April/May 1236	November 1236	Son of Iltutmish
5	Razia Sultan	unknown	15 October 1240	November 1236	20 April 1240	Daughter of Iltutmish
6	Muiz ud din Bahram	9 July 1212	15 May 1242	May 1240	15 May 1242	Son of Iltutmish
7	Ala-ud-Din Masud Shah	unknown	10 June 1246	May 1242	10 June 1246	Son of Ruknuddin Firuz
8	Nasiruddin Mahmud Shah (Mahmud I)	1229 or 1230	18 February 1266	10 June 1246	18 February 1266	Grandson of Iltutmish
9	Ghiyas ud din Balban	1216	1287	February 1266	1287	Turkish noble in the court of Iltutmish
10	Muiz ud din Qaiqabad	1269	1 February 1290	1287	1 February 1290	Grandson of Balban
11	Shamsuddin Kayumars	1285/1287	13 June 1290	1 February 1290	13 June 1290	Son of Qaiqabad

=== Khalji dynasty (1290 – 1320) ===
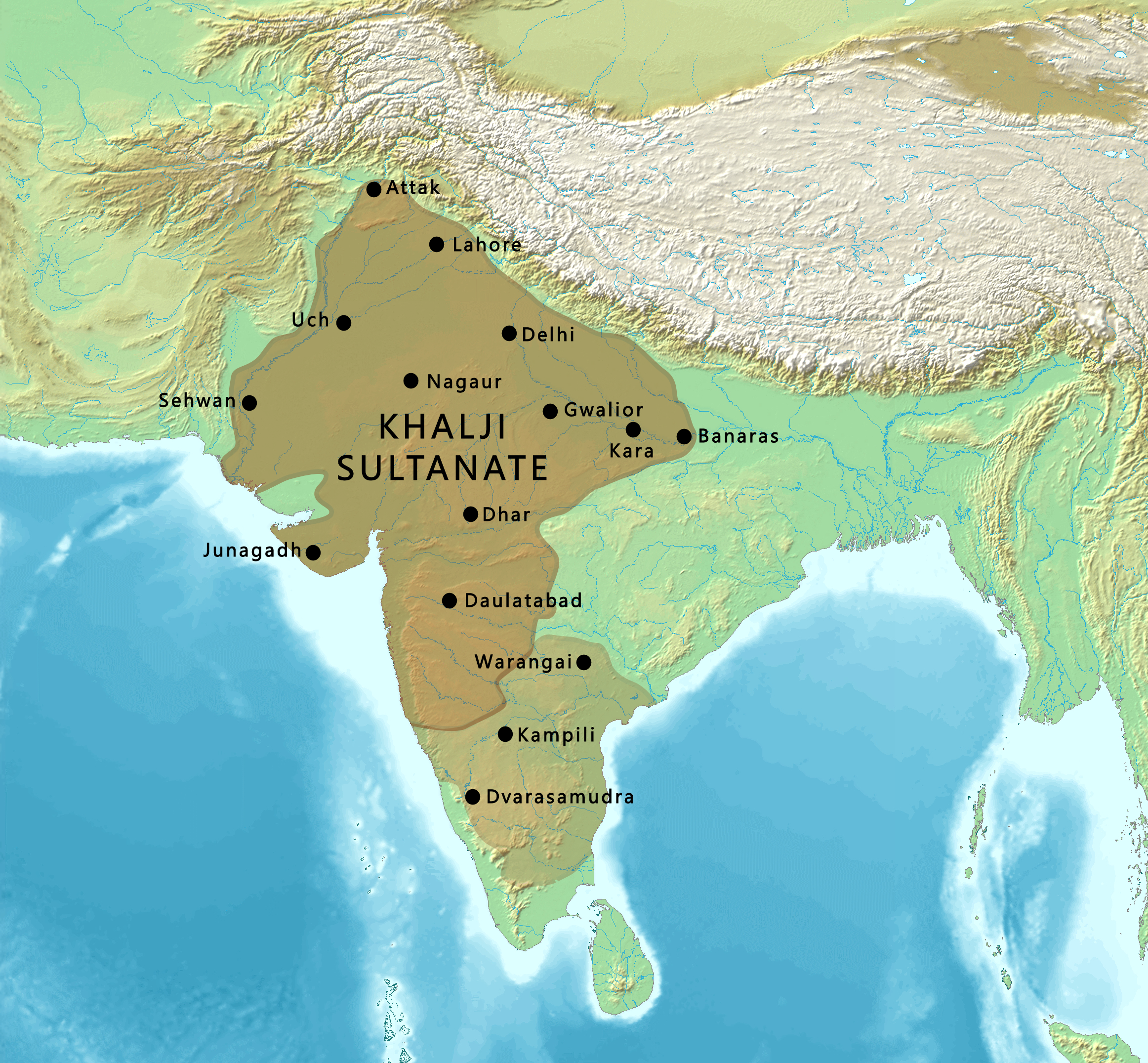
Delhi Sultanate under Khalji dynasty

S/N	Name	Birth date	Death date	Beginning of reign	End of reign	Notes
12	Jalal-ud-din Khalji (Firuz II)	1220	19 July 1296	13 June 1290	19 July 1296	
–	Ruknuddin Ibrahim	unknown	after 1296	July 1296	November 1296	Son of Jalal-ud-din Khalji. He ruled for a short time, not always indicating his names on the lists.
13	Alauddin Khalji	c. 1266	4 January 1316	November 1296	4 January 1316	Nephew of Jalal-ud-din Khalji
14	Shihabuddin Omar	1310 or 1311	April 1316	5 January 1316	April 1316	Son of Alauddin Khalji
15	Qutbuddin Mubarak Shah	1299	9 July 1320	14 April 1316	1 May 1320	Son of Alauddin Khalji

=== Outside of the dynasties (1320) ===
S/N	Name	Birth date	Death date	Beginning of reign	End of reign	Notes
16	Khusrau Khan	unknown	1320	10 July 1320	5 September 1320	He ruled for a short time, not founding a dynasty.

=== Tughluq dynasty (1320 – 1414) ===
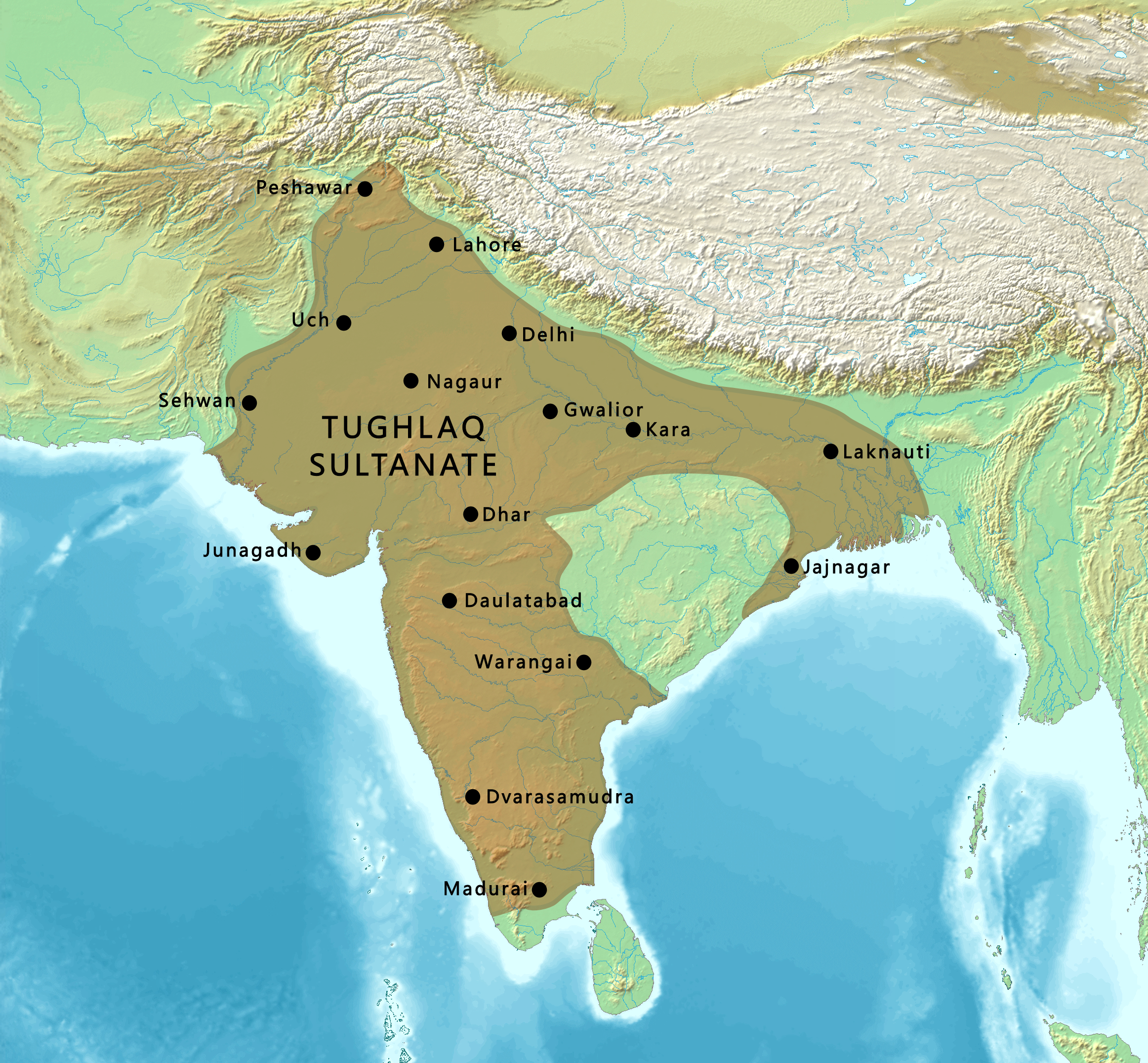
Delhi Sultanate under Tughluq dynasty

S/N	Name	Birth date	Death date	Beginning of reign	End of reign	Notes
17	Ghiyath al-Din Tughluq (Tughluq I)	unknown	1 February 1325	8 September 1320	1 February 1325	
18	Muhammad bin Tughluq (Muhammad II)	c. 1290	20 March 1351	1 February 1325	20 March 1351	Son of Ghiyath al-Din Tughluq
19	Firuz Shah Tughlaq (Firuz III)	1309	20 September 1388	23 March 1351	20 September 1388	Son-in-law of Ghiyath al-Din Tughluq
20	Tughluq Khan (Tughluq II)	unknown	14 March 1389	20 September 1388	14 March 1389	Grandson of Firuz Shah Tughlaq
21	Abu Bakr Shah	unknown	after 1390	15 March 1389	August 1390	Grandson of Firuz Shah Tughlaq
22	Nasir ud din Muhammad Shah III (Muhammad III)	unknown	20 January 1394	31 August 1390	20 January 1394	Son of Firuz Shah Tughlaq
23	Ala ud-din Sikandar Shah	unknown	8 March 1394	22 January 1394	8 March 1394	Son of Nasir ud din Muhammad Shah III
24	Nasir-ud-din Mahmud Shah Tughluq	unknown	February 1413	March 1394	February 1413	Son of Nasir ud din Muhammad Shah III
–	Nasir-ud-din Nusrat Shah Tughluq	unknown	1398 or 1399	January 1395	1398 or 1399	Brother of Tughluq Khan. Mahmud Shah's anti-king, claimant to the throne, sub-ruler.

=== Sayyid dynasty (1414 – 1451) ===
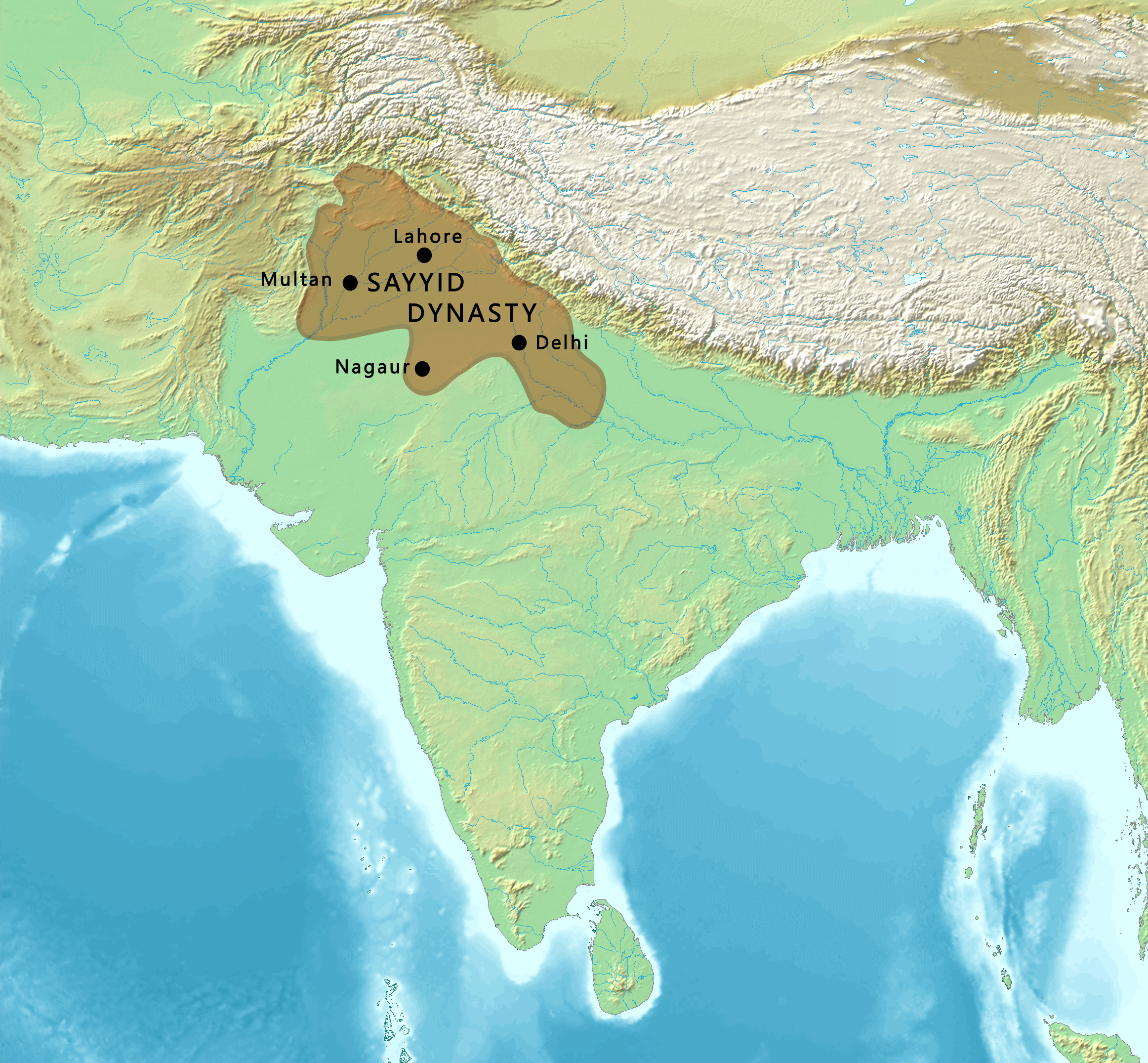
Delhi Sultanate under Sayyid dynasty

S/N	Name	Birth date	Death date	Beginning of reign	End of reign	Notes
25	Khizr Khan	1361	20 May 1421	28 May 1414	20 May 1421	
26	Mubarak Shah	1378	19 February 1434	21 May 1421	19 February 1434	Son of Khizr Khan
27	Muhammad Shah (Muhammad IV)	1379	January 1445	February 1434	January 1445	Grandson of Khizr Khan
28	Alam Shah	unknown	July 1478	January 1445	19 April 1451	Son of Muhammad Shah

=== Lodi dynasty (1451 – 1526) ===
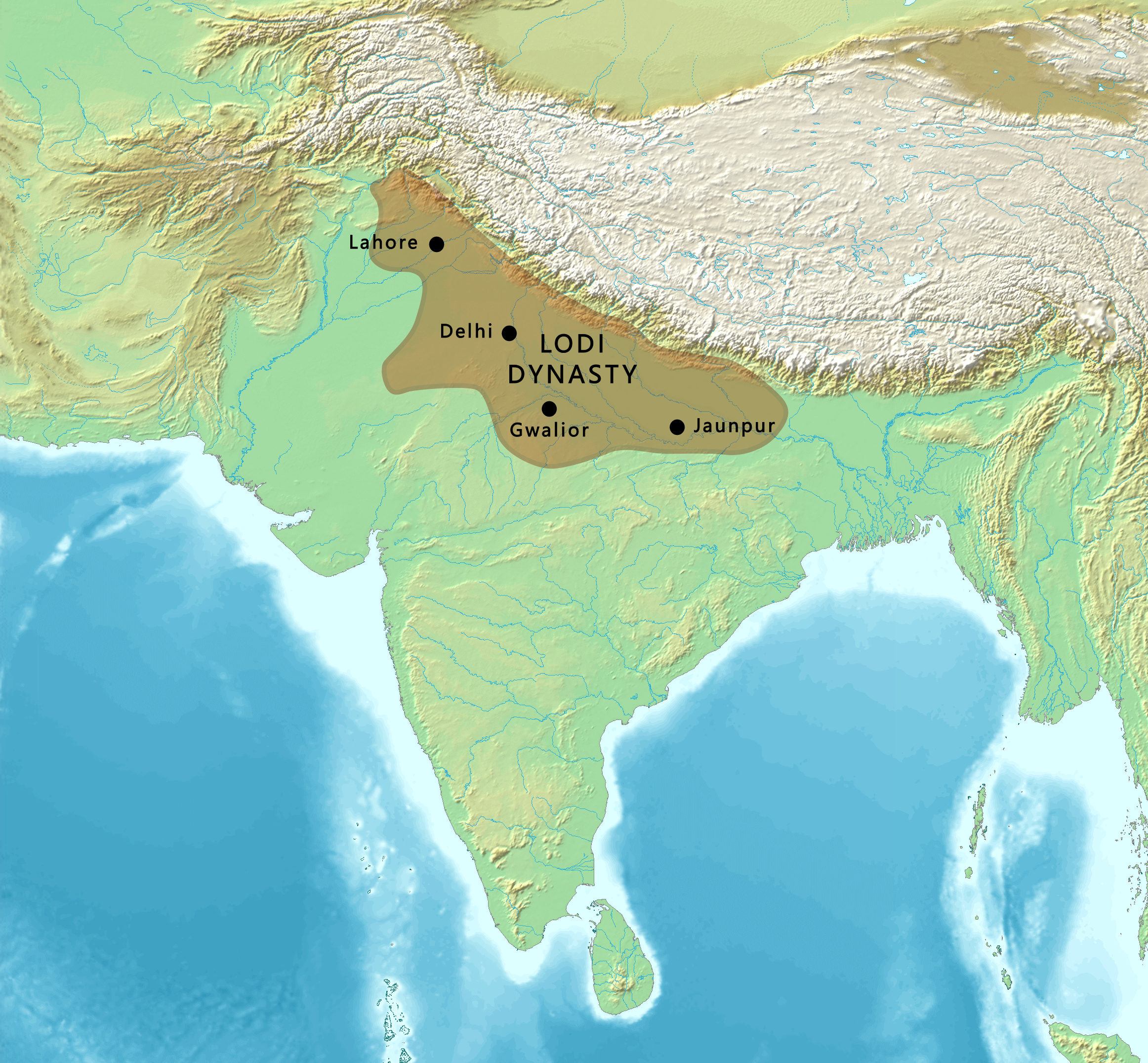
Delhi Sultanate under Lodi dynasty

S/N	Name	Birth date	Death date	Beginning of reign	End of reign	Notes
29	Bahlul Lodi	1420	12 July 1489	19 April 1451	12 July 1489	
30	Sikandar Lodi (Sikandar II)	17 July 1458	21 November 1517	17 July 1489	21 November 1517	Son of Bahlul Lodi
31	Ibrahim Lodi	1480	21 April 1526	November 1517	21 April 1526	Son of Sikandar Lodi

== Chiefs of Pothohar ==
=== House of Khokhars ===
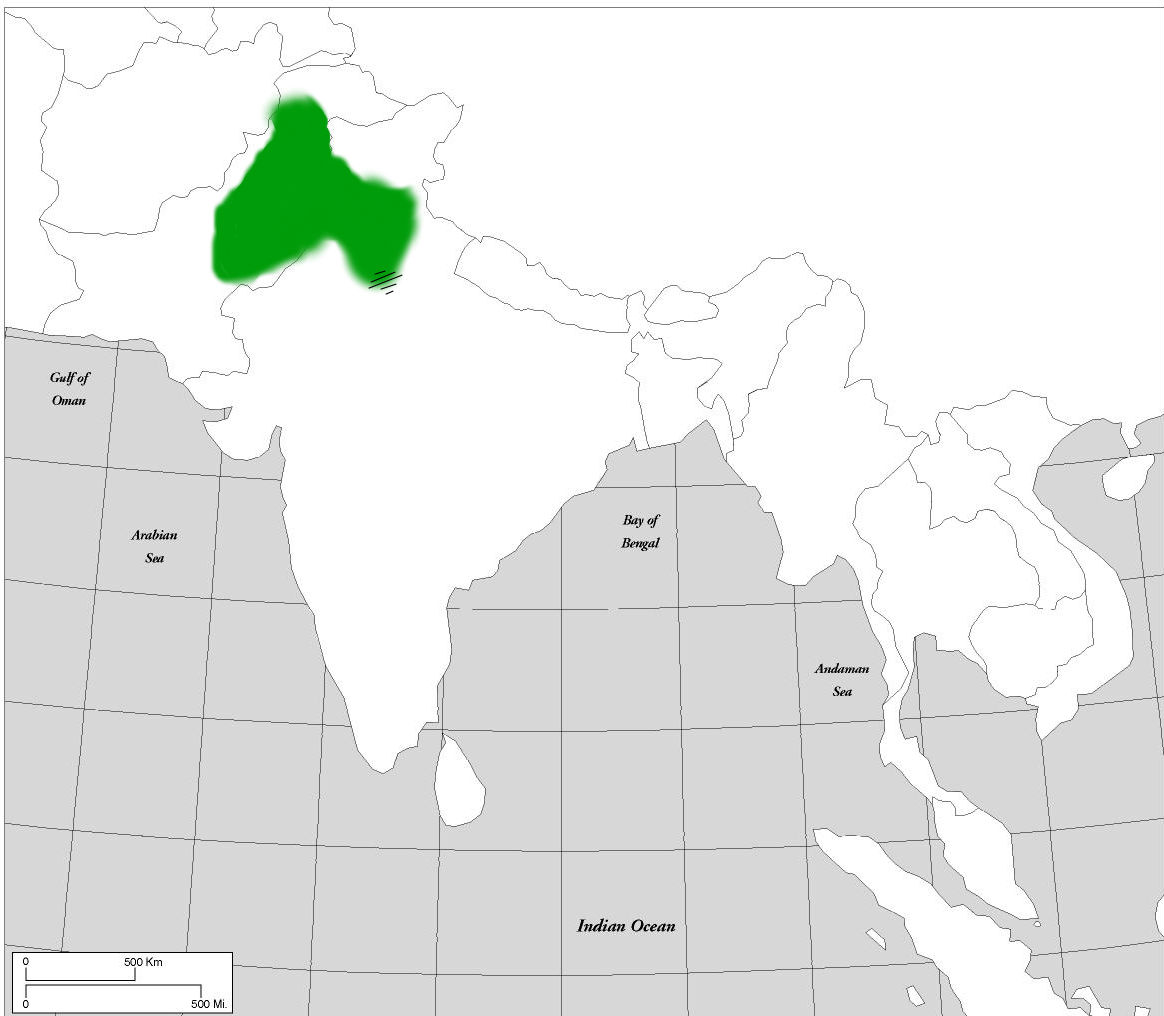
Khokhar dominion in 1431 after the capture of Delhi

Ruler	Reign	Note
Nusrat Khokhar	?? ‐ 1394	died fighting the Timurid forces
Shaikha Khokhar	1394 - 1420	
Jasrat Khokhar	1420 - 1442	Had capital at Sialkot

=== House of Gakhars ===
Ruler	Reign	Note
Kaigohar Gakhar	unknown	Built Pharwala Fort
Jhanda Khan Ghakkar	unknown - c.1493	Established city of Rawalpindi
Polakh Khan Gakhar	unknown	Father of Hathi Khan Gakhar
Tatar Khan Ghakkar	unknown - 1519	Made alliance with Babur
Hathi Khan Gakkar	1519 - 1526	
Sarang Khan Gakhar	1526 - 1545	Died fighting against Sher Shah Suri at Rawat
Adam Khan Gakhar	1546 - 1555	Under Mughal Empire
Kamal Khan Gakhar	1555 - 1566	
Mubarak Khan Gakhar	Unknown	
Said Khan Gakhar	1563 - 1597	founded Saidpur village
Nazar Khan Gakhar	Unknown	Commander of 500
Miran Shah Ghazi Gakhar	Unknown	Founder of Mirpur
Allah Quli Khan Gakhar	1681 - 1705	
Muqarrab Khan Gakhar	1705 - 1767	Last effective ruler of Pothohar

== Langah Sultanate (1445 – 1540) ==
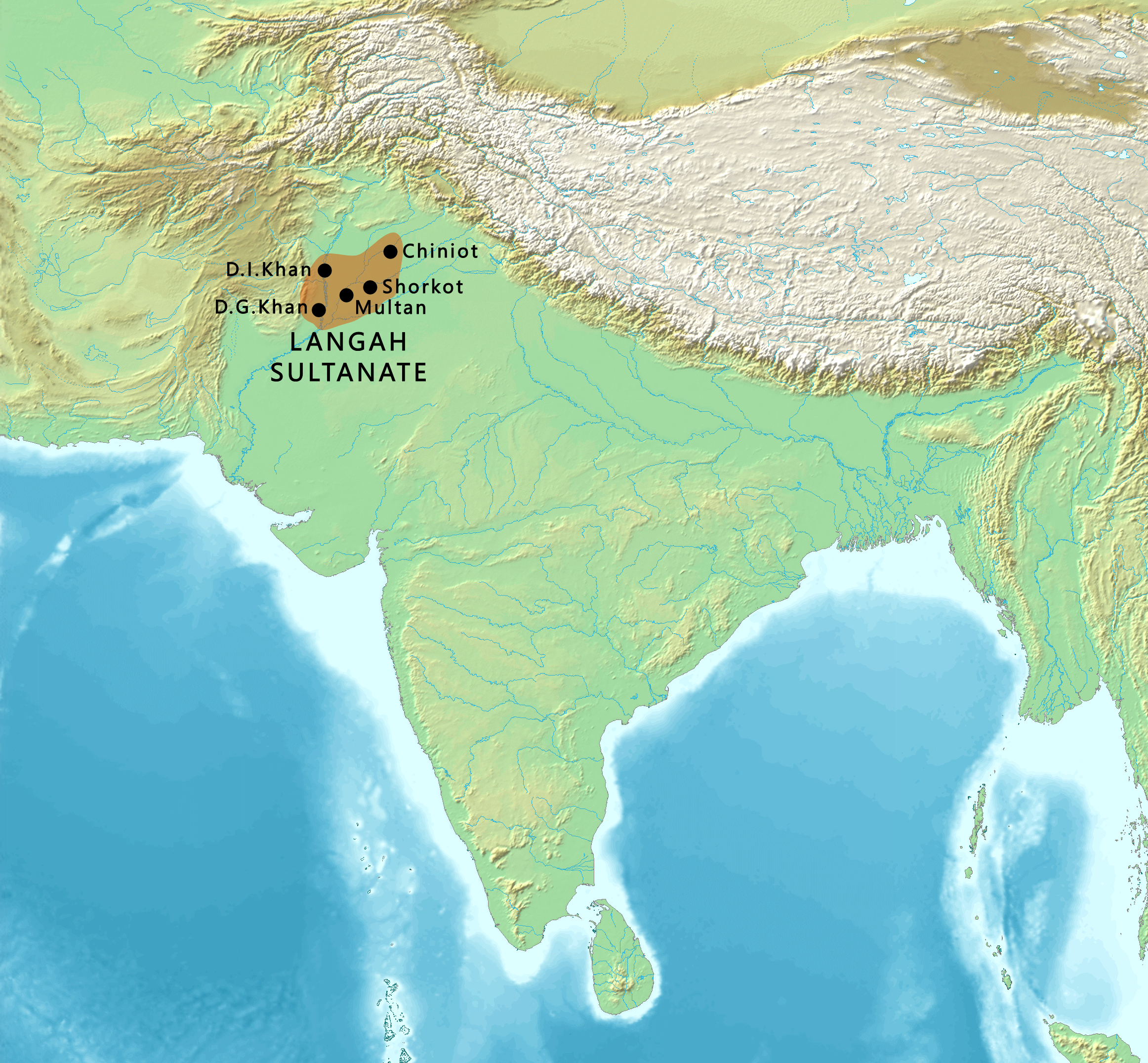
Langah Sultanate at its peak in 1475

Titular Name(s)	Personal Name	Reign
Sultan Qutbu'd-Din سلطان قطب الدین	Rai Sahra Langah رائے ساحرہ لنگہ	1445–1469
Sultan Husseyn I سلطان حسین اول	Husseyn Shah Langah حسین لنگہ	1469–1498
Sultan Mahmud I سلطان محمود اول	Budha Khan Langah بدھا خان لنگہ	1498–1518
Sultan Husseyn II سلطان حسین دوم	Husseyn Langah حسین لنگہ	1518–1526
Sultan Mahmud II سلطان محمود دوم	Mahmud Khan Langah محمود خان لنگہ	1426–1540

== Mughal Empire (1526 – 1799) ==
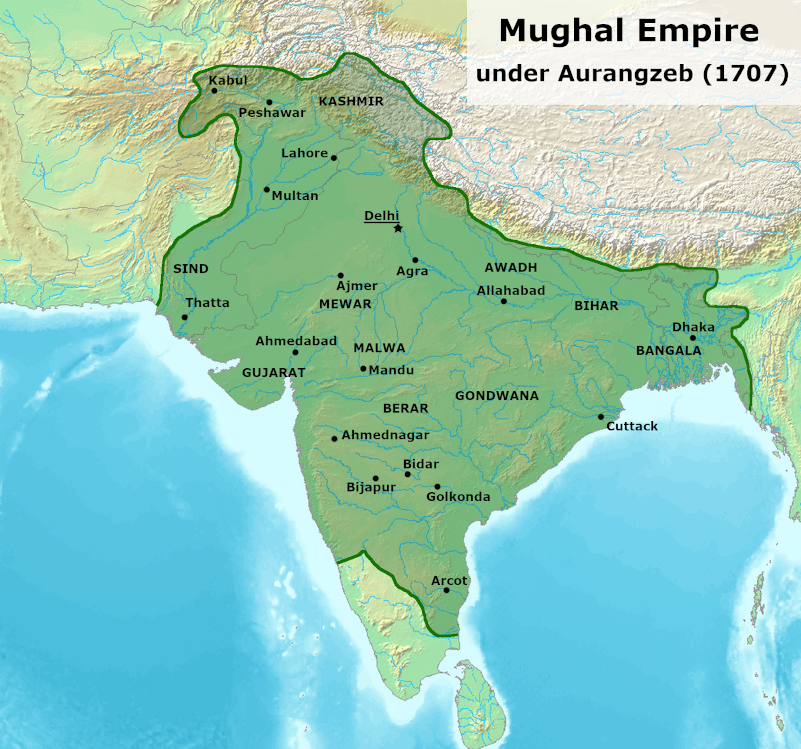
Mughal Empire at its greatest extent

Portrait	Titular Name	Birth Name	Birth	Reign	Death
1	Babur بابر	Zahir Ud-Din Muhammad Ghazi ظہیر الدین محمد	14 February 1483 Andijan, Uzbekistan	20 April 1526 – 26 December 1530 (4 years 8 months 9 days)	26 December 1530 (aged 47) Agra, India
2	Humayun ہمایوں	Nasir Ud-Din Baig Muhammad Khan ناصر الدین بیگ محمد خان	6 March 1508 Kabul, Afghanistan	22 February 1555 – 27 January 1556 (10 years 3 months 25 days)	27 January 1556 (aged 47) Delhi, India
3	Akbar اکبر	Abu'l Fath Jalal Ud-Din Muhammad ابوالفتح جلال الدین محمد	15 October 1542 Umerkot, Pakistan	11 February 1556 – 27 October 1605 (49 years 9 months 0 days)	27 October 1605 (aged 63) Agra, India
4	Jahangir جہانگیر	Nur Ud-Din Baig Muhammad khan Salim نورالدین بیگ محمد خان سلیم	31 August 1569 Agra, India	3 November 1605 – 28 October 1627 (21 years 11 months 23 days)	28 October 1627 (aged 58) Jammu and Kashmir, India
5	Shah Jahan شاہ جہان	Shahab Ud-Din Muhammad Khurram شہاب الدین محمد خرم	5 January 1592 Lahore, Pakistan	19 January 1628 – 31 July 1658 (30 years 8 months 25 days)	22 January 1666 (aged 74) Agra, India
6	Aurangzeb اورنگزیب Alamgir عالمگیر	Muhi Ud-Din Muhammad محی الدین محمد	3 November 1618 Gujarat, India	31 July 1658 – 3 March 1707 (48 years 7 months 0 days)	3 March 1707 (aged 88) Ahmednagar, India
7	Azam Shah اعظم شاہ	Qutb Ud-Din Muhammad قطب الدين محمد	28 June 1653 Burhanpur, India	14 March 1707 – 20 June 1707	20 June 1707 (aged 53) Agra, India
8	Bahadur Shah بہادر شاہ Shah Alam شاہ عالم	Abul-Nasr Sayyid Qutb-ud-din Mirza Muhammad Muazzam ابوالنصر سید قطب الدین مرزا محمد معظم	14 October 1643 Burhanpur, India	19 June 1707 – 27 February 1712 (4 years, 253 days)	27 February 1712 (aged 68) Lahore, Pakistan
9	Jahandar Shah جہاندار شاہ	Mu'izz-ud-Din Beg Muhammad Khan Bahādur معیز الدین بیگ محمد خان بہادر	9 May 1661 Deccan, India	27 February 1712 – 11 February 1713 (0 years, 350 days)	12 February 1713 (aged 51) Delhi, India
10	Farrukhsiyar فرخ سیر	Abu'l Muzaffar Muīn-ud-Dīn Muhammad Shāh Farrukhsiyar Alim Akbar Sāni Wālā Shān Pādshāh-i-bahr-u-bar ابوالمظفر معین الدین محمد شاہ فرخ سیار علیم اکبر ثانی والا شان پادشاہ البحر البر; Puppet King Under the Sayyids of Barha	20 August 1685 Aurangabad, India	11 January 1713 – 28 February 1719 (6 years, 48 days)	19 April 1719 (aged 33) Delhi, India
11	Rafi ud-Darajat رفیع الدرجات	Abu'l Barakat Shams-ud-Din Muhammad Rafi ud-Darajat Padshah Ghazi Shahanshah-i-Bahr-u-Bar ابوالبرکات شمس الدین محمد رفیع الدراجات پادشاہ غازی شہنشاہ البحر البر; Puppet King Under the Sayyids of Barha	1 December 1699	28 February 1719 – 6 June 1719 (0 years, 98 days)	6 June 1719 (aged 19) Agra, India
12	Shah Jahan II شاہ جہان دوم	Rafi-ud-Din Muhammad Rafi-ud-Daulah رفیع الدین محمد رفیع الدولہ; Puppet King Under the Sayyids of Barha	5 January 1696	6 June 1719 – 17 September 1719 (0 years, 105 days)	18 September 1719 (aged 23) Agra, India
13	Muhammad Shah محمد شاہ	Nasir-ud-Din Muḥammad Shah Roshan Akhtar Bahadur Ghazi ناصر الدین محمد شاہ روشن اختر بہادر غازی; Puppet King Under the Sayyids of Barha	7 August 1702 Ghazni, Afghanistan	27 September 1719 – 26 April 1748 (28 years, 212 days)	26 April 1748 (aged 45) Delhi, India
14	Ahmad Shah Bahadur احمد شاہ بہادر	Abu-Nasir Mujahid ud-din Muhammad Ahmad Shah Bahadur Ghazi ابو ناصر مجاہد الدین محمد احمد شاہ بہادر غازی	23 December 1725 Delhi, India	29 April 1748 – 2 June 1754 (6 years, 37 days)	1 January 1775 (aged 49) Delhi, India
15	Alamgir II عالمگیر دوم	Aziz Ud-Din Muhammad عزیز اُلدین محمد	6 June 1699 Burhanpur, India	3 June 1754 – 29 November 1759 (5 years, 180 days)	29 November 1759 (aged 60) Kotla Fateh Shah, India
16	Shah Jahan III شاہ جہان سوم	Muhi Ul-Millat محی اُلملت	1711	10 December 1759 – 10 October 1760 (282 days)	1772 (aged 60–61)
17	Shah Alam II شاہ عالم دوم	Abdu'llah Jalal ud-din Abu'l Muzaffar Ham ud-din Muhammad 'Mirza Ali Gauhar عبدالله جلال الدین ابوالمظفر هم الدین محمد میرزا علی گوهر شاه علم دوم	25 June 1728 Delhi, India	10 October 1760 – 31 July 1788 (27 years, 301 days)	19 November 1806 (aged 78) Delhi, India
18	Shah Jahan IV جہان شاه چہارم	Bidar Bakht Mahmud Shah Bahadur Jahan Shah بیدار بخت محمود شاه بهادر جہان شاہ	1749 Delhi, India	31 July 1788 – 11 October 1788 (63 days)	1790 (aged 40–41) Delhi, India
19	Shah Alam II شاہ عالم دوم	Abdu'llah Jalal ud-din Abu'l Muzaffar Ham ud-din Muhammad 'Mirza Ali Gauhar عبدالله جلال الدین ابوالمظفر هم الدین محمد میرزا علی گوهر شاه علم دوم; Puppet King under the Maratha Empire	25 June 1728 Delhi, India	16 October 1788 – 19 November 1806 (18 years, 339 days)	19 November 1806 (aged 78) Delhi, India
20	Akbar Shah II اکبر شاہ دوم	Sultan Ibn Sultan Sahib al-Mufazi Wali Ni'mat Haqiqi Khudavand Mujazi Abu Nasir Mu'in al-Din Muhammad Akbar Shah Pad-Shah Ghazi سلطان ابن سلطان صاحب المفاضی ولی نعمت حقی خداوند مجازی ابو ناصر معین الدین محمد اکبر شاہ پاد شاہ غازی; Puppet King under the East India Company	22 April 1760 Mukundpur, India	19 November 1806 – 28 September 1837 (30 years, 321 days)	28 September 1837 (aged 77) Delhi, India

== Sur Empire (1540 – 1556) ==
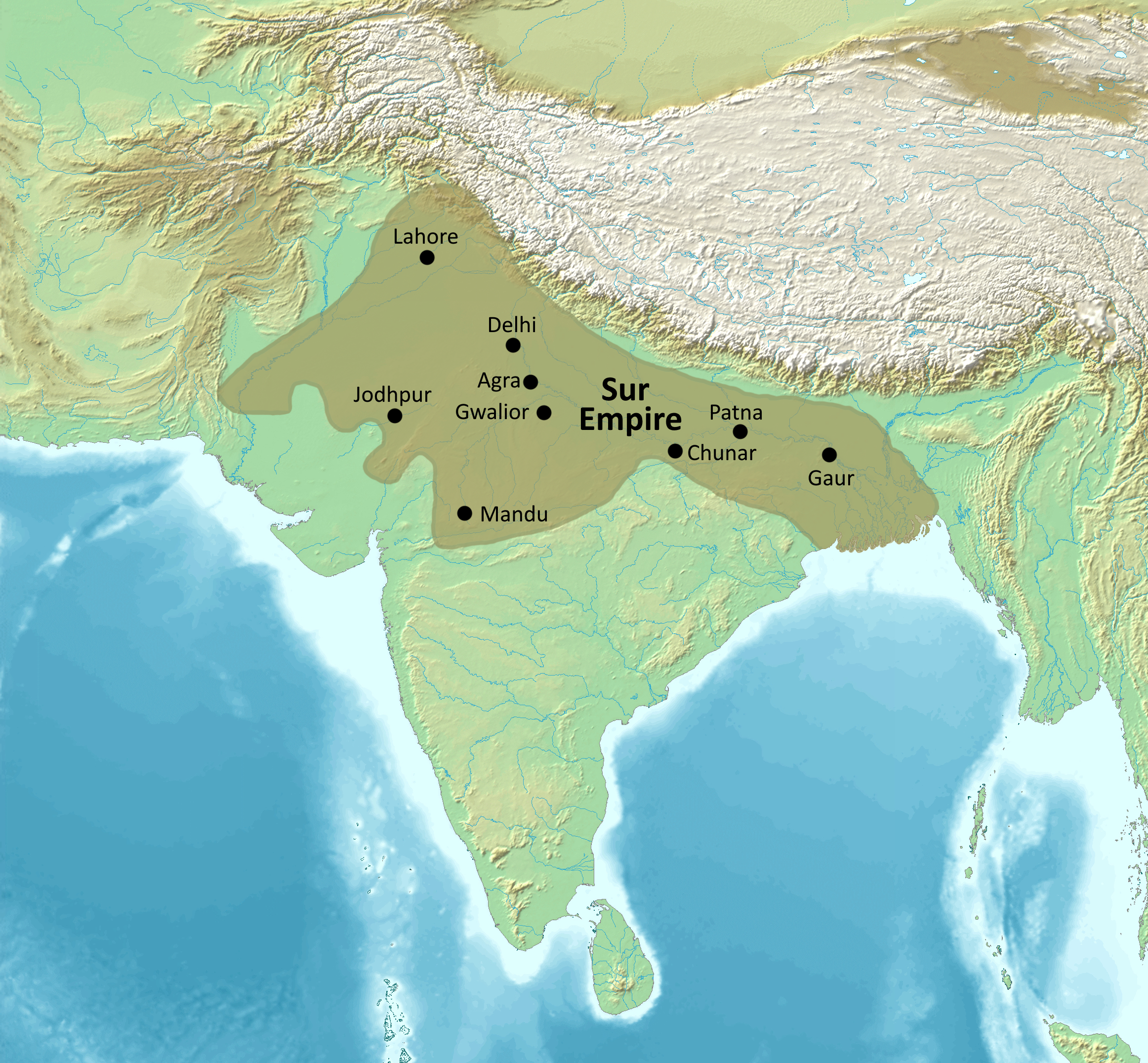
Sur Empire at its height under Sher Shah Suri

S. n.	Picture	Name	Birth date	Death date	Reign	Notes
1st		Sher Shah Suri	1472 or 1486	22 May 1545	6 April 1538/17 May 1540 — 22 May 1545	
2nd		Islam Shah Suri	1507	22 November 1554	26 May 1545 — 22 November 1554	Son of Sher Shah Suri.
3rd		Firuz Shah Suri	4 May 1542	1554	1554	Son of Islam Shah Suri.
4th		Muhammad Adil Shah	unknown	1557	1554 — 1555	Son-in-law of Sher Shah Suri.
5th		Ibrahim Shah Suri	unknown	1567/1568	1555	Brother-in-law of Sher Shah Suri.
6th		Sikandar Shah Suri	unknown	1559	1555 — 22 June 1555	Brother-in-law of Sher Shah Suri.
7th		Adil Shah Suri	unknown	April 1557	22 June 1555 — 1556	Brother of Sikandar Shah Suri.

== Sial State (1723 – 1818) ==
- Walidad Khan Sial 1723 – 1747
- Inayatullah Khan Sial 1747 – 1787
- Kabir Khan Sial 1787 – 1798
- Ahmad Khan Sial 1798 – 1818

== Nawabs of Dera Ghazi Khan (1738 – 1779) ==
- Mahmud Khan Gujjar (1738 – 1772)
- Barkhurdar Khan Gujjar (1772 – 1779)

== Misls ==
=== Bhangi Misl (1716 – 1802) ===
- Chhajja Singh Dhillon (1716 – ??)
- Bhuma Singh Dhillon (?? – 1746)
- Hari Singh Dhillon (1746 – 1766)
- Jhanda Singh Dhillon (1766 – 1774)
- Ganda Singh Dhillon (1774 – 1776)
- Charhat Singh Dhillon (1776 – 1776)
- Desu Singh Dhillon (1776 – 1782)
- Gulab Singh Dhillon (1782 – 1800)
- Gurdit Singh Dhillon (1800 – 1802)

=== Singhpuria Misl (1733 – 1816) ===
- Kapur Singh 1733 – 1753
- Khushal Singh 1753 – 1795
- Buddh Singh 1795 – 1816

=== Ramgarhia Misl (1748 – 1808) ===
Name (Birth–Death)	Portrait	Reign	Ref.
Jassa Singh Ramgarhia (1723 – 20 April 1803)		1748 – 1803	
Jodh Singh Ramgarhia (died August 1815)		1803 – 1808	

=== Singh Krora Misl (1748 – 1808) ===
No.	Name (Birth–Death)		Portrait	Reign	Ref.
1	Sham Singh (died 1739)			? – 1739	
2	Karam Singh		?	?	
3	Karora Singh (died 1761)		?	? – 1761	
4	Baghel Singh (died 1802)			1761 – 1802	
5 (disputed)	Jodh Singh (born 1751)	Sukhu Singh	?	1802 – ?	
6	Rattan Kaur (died 1848)		?	? – 1848	

=== Dallewalia Misl (1748 – 1807) ===
- Gulab Singh Khatri 1748 – 1759
- Gurdiyal Singh 1759 – 1764
- Tara Singh Ghaiba 1764 – 1807

=== Nakai Misl (1748 – 1810) ===
- Heera Singh Sandhu Nakai (r. 1748–1767; d. 1767)
- Sardar Nar Singh Nakai (r. 1767-1775; d. 1775)
- Ran Singh Nakai (r. 1775-1784; d. 1784)
- Bhagwan Singh Nakai (r. 1784-1789; d. 1789)
- Gyan Singh Nakai (r. 1789-1807; d. 1807)
- Kahan Singh Nakai (r. 1807–1810; d. 1873).

== Chattha State (1750 – 1797) ==
- Nur Muhammad Chattha 1750 – 1765
- Pir Muhammad Chattha 1765 – 1780
- Ahmad Khan Chattha 1765 – 1780
- Ghulam Muhammad Chattha 1780 – 1790
- Jan Muhammad Chattha 1790 – 1797

== Nawabs of Mankera (1772 – 1839) ==
- Sarbuland Khan Sadozai 1772 – 1815
- Hafiz Ahmed Khan Sadozai 1815 – 1839

== Nawab of Punjab ==
Name (Birth–Death)	Portrait	Reign
Adina Beg Khan (1710 – 15 September 1758)		10 April 1758 – 15 September 1758

== Princely states ==
=== Chamba State (550 – 1948) ===
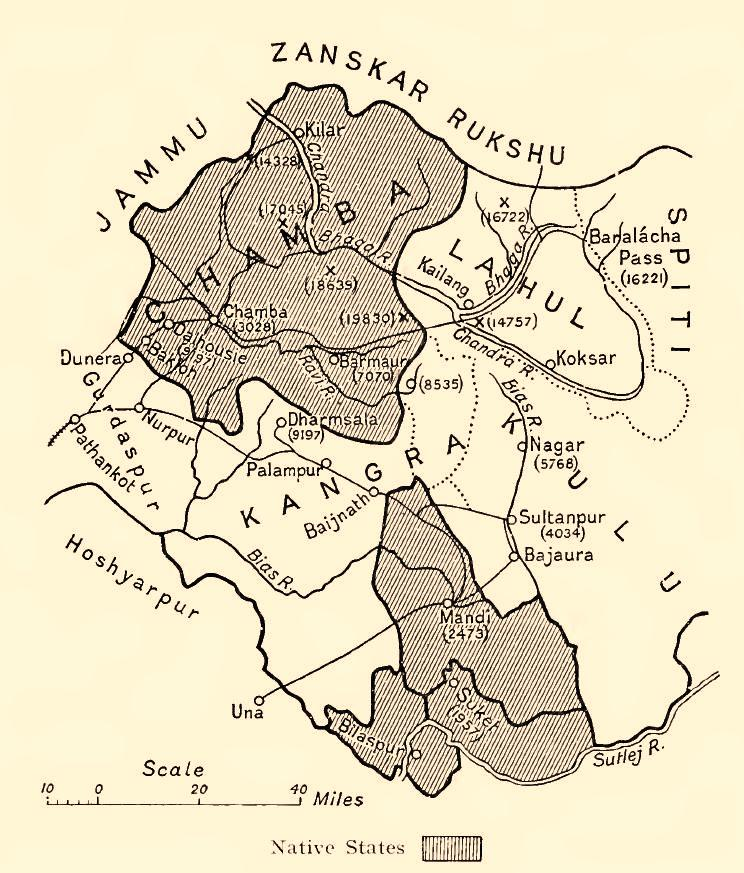
State of Chamba next to the State of Kangra, c. 1911

- Raja Yugakar Verman
- Raja Vidagdha Verman
- Raja Dodaka Verman
- Raja Vichitra Verman
- Raja Dhariya Verman
- Raja Salavahana Verman
- Raja Soma Varman
- Raja Asata Varman
- Raja Jasata Verman
- Raja Dhala Verman
- Raja Udayan Varman
- Raja Anand Verman
- Raja Ganesa Verman
- Raja Pratap Singh Verman, (from 1559 to 1586)
- Raja Vir Vahnu Verman (1586 to 1589)
- Raja Balbhadra Verman (1589 to 1641) as Chamba.
- 1690 - 1720 Udai Singh (b. ... - d. 1720)
- 1720 - 1735 Ugar Singh
- 1735 - 1794 Raj Singh (b. 1735 - d. 1794)
- 1794 - 1808 Jit Singh (b. 1775 - d. 1808)
- 1808 - 1844 Charhat Singh (b. 1803 - d. 1844)
- 1844 - 1870 Shri Singh (b. 1839 - d. 1870)
- 1870 - Apr 1873 Gopal Singh (b. 18... - d. 1893)
- 17 Apr 1873 – 22 Jan 1904 Sham Singh (b. 1866 - d. 1905)
- 22 Jan 1904 – 22 Sep 1919 Bhuri Singh (b. 1869 - d. 1919)
- 22 Sep 1919 - 7 Dec 1935 Ram Singh (b. 1890 - d. 1935)
- 7 Dec 1935 – 15 Aug 1947 Tikka Lakshman Singh (b. 1924 - d. 1971)

=== State of Bahawalpur (1748 – 1955) ===
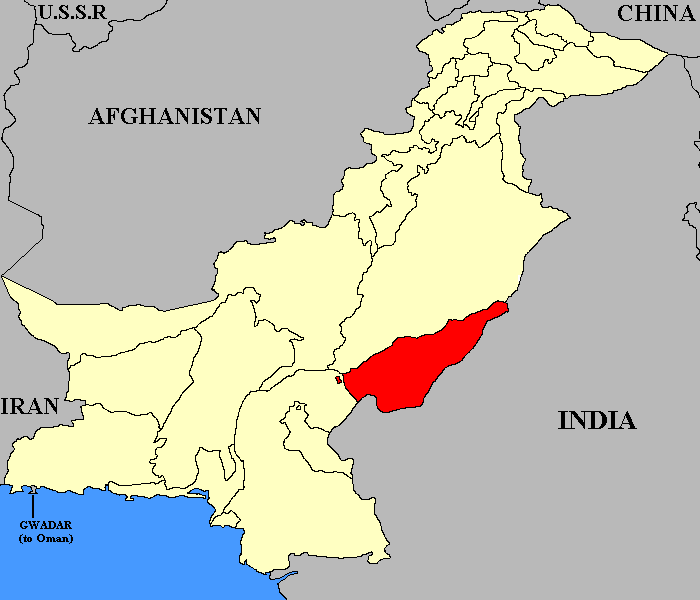
State of Bahawalpur alongside other Princely states and British Indian provinces and presidencies

Nawab Amir of Bahawalpur	Tenure
Bahawal Khan Abbasi I	1748 – 1750
Mubarak Khan Abbasi II	1750 – 1772
Bahawal Khan Abbasi II	1772 – 1809
Sadeq Khan Abbasi II	1809 – 1827
Bahawal Khan Abbasi III	1827 – 1852
Sadeq Khan Abbasi III	1852 – 1853
Fath Mohammad Khan Abbasi	1853 – 1858
Rahim Yaar Khan Abbasi	1858 – 1866
Sadeq Khan Abbasi IV	1866 – 1899
Bahawal Khan Abbasi V	1899 – 1907
Sadeq Khan Abbasi V	1907 – 1955

=== Patiala State (1761 – 1947) ===
No.	Name (Birth–Death)	Portrait	Reign	Enthronement	Ref.
Sardars
1	Ala Singh (1691 or 1695 – 1765)		1709 – 1765	?	
Maharajas
2	Amar Singh (7 June 1748 – February 1781)		1765 – 1781	?	
3	Sahib Singh (18 August 1773 – 26 March 1813)		1781 – 1813	?	
4	Karam Singh (12 October 1797 – 23 December 1845)		1813 – 1845	30 June 1813	
5	Narinder Singh (26 October 1824 – 13 November 1862)		1845 – 1862	18 January 1846	
6	Mahendra Singh (16 September 1852 – 13 or 14 April 1876)		1862 – 1876	29 January 1863	
7	Rajinder Singh (25 May 1872 – 8 November 1900)		1876 – 1900	6 January 1877	
8	Bhupinder Singh (12 October 1891 – 1938)		1900 – 1938	?	
9	Yadavindra Singh (7 January 1913 – 17 June 1974)		1938 – 1974	?	

=== Jind State (1763 – 1948) ===
No.	Name (Birth–Death)	Portrait	Reign	Enthronement	Ref.
Sardars
1	Sukhchain Singh (1683 – 1758)	?	? – 1758	?	
Rajas
2	Gajpat Singh (15 April 1738 – 11 November 1789)		1758 – 1789	?	
3	Bhag Singh (23 September 1760 – 16 June 1819)		1789 – 1819	November 1789	
4	Fateh Singh (6 May 1789 – 3 February 1822)		1819 – 1822	?	
5	Sangat Singh (16 July 1810 – 4/5 November 1834)		1822 – 1834	30 July 1822	
6	Swarup Singh (30 May 1812 – 26 January 1864)		1834 – 1864	April 1837	
7	Raghubir Singh (1832 – 7 March 1887)		1864 – 1887	31 March 1864	
8	Ranbir Singh (11 October 1879 – 1 April 1948)		1887 – 1948	27 February 1888	

=== Nabha State (1763 – 1947) ===
No.	Name (Birth–Death)	Portrait	Reign	Enthronement	Ref.
Sardars
1	Hamir Singh (died 1783)		1754 – 1783	?	
Rajas
2	Jaswant Singh (1775 – 22 May 1840)		1783 – 1840	?	
3	Devinder Singh (5 September 1822 – 14/15 November 1865)		1840 – 1846	15 October 1840	
4	Bharpur Singh (5 October 1840 – 9 November 1863)		1846 – 1863	?	
5	Bhagwan Singh (30 November 1842 – 31 May 1871)		1863 – 1871	17 February 1864	
Maharajas
6	Hira Singh (19 December 1843 – 24 December 1911)		1871 – 1911	10 August 1871	
7	Ripudaman Singh (4 March 1883 – 14 December 1942)		1911 – 1923	24 January 1912	
8	Partap Singh (21 September 1919 – 22 July 1995)		1923 – 1948		

=== Kapurthala State (1772 – 1947) ===
No.	Name (Birth–Death)	Portrait	Reign	Ref.
Sardars
1	Jassa Singh Ahluwalia (1718–1783)		1777 – 20 October 1783	
2	Bagh Singh Ahluwalia (1747–1801)		20 October 1783 – 10 July 1801	
Rajas
3	Fateh Singh Ahluwalia (1784–1837)		10 July 1801 – 20 October 1837	
4	Nihal Singh (1817–1852)		20 October 1837 – 13 September 1852	
5	Randhir Singh (1831–1870)		13 September 1852 – 12 March 1861	
Raja-i Rajgan
–	Randhir Singh (1831–1870)		12 March 1861 – 2 April 1870	
6	Kharak Singh (1850–1877)		2 April 1870 – 3 September 1877	
7	Jagatjit Singh (1872–1949)		3 September 1877 – 12 December 1911	
Maharajas
–	Jagatjit Singh (1872–1949)		12 December 1911 – 15 August 1947	
Titular
–	Jagatjit Singh (1872–1949)		15 August 1947 – 19 June 1949	
8	Paramjit Singh			
9	Sukhjit Singh			

== Sikh Empire (1799 – 1849) ==
Sikh Empire at its greatest extent under Maharaja Ranjit Singh

S. No.	Name	Portrait	Birth and death		Reign			Note	
1	Maharaja Ranjit Singh		13 November 1780 (Gujranwala)	27 June 1839 (Lahore)	12 April 1801	27 June 1839	38 years, 76 days	The first Sikh ruler	Stroke
2	Maharaja Kharak Singh		22 February 1801 (Lahore)	5 November 1840 (Lahore)	27 June 1839	8 October 1839	103 days	Son of Ranjit Singh	Poisoning
3	Maharaja Nau Nihal Singh		11 February 1820 (Lahore)	6 November 1840 (Lahore)	8 October 1839	6 November 1840	1 year, 29 days	Son of Kharak Singh	Assassinated
4	Maharani Chand Kaur		1802 (Fatehgarh Churian)	11 June 1842 (Lahore)	6 November 1840	18 January 1841	73 days	Wife of Kharak Singh and the only female ruler of Sikh Empire	Abdicated
5	Maharaja Sher Singh		4 December 1807 (Batala)	15 September 1843 (Lahore)	18 January 1841	15 September 1843	2 years, 240 days	Son of Ranjit Singh	Assassinated
6	Maharaja Duleep Singh		6 September 1838 (Lahore)	22 October 1893 (Paris)	15 September 1843	29 March 1849	5 years, 195 days	Son of Ranjit Singh	Exiled
7	Maharani Jind Kaur (regent; nominal)		1817 (Gujranwala)	1 August 1863 (Kensington)	15 September 1843	29 March 1849	5 years, 195 days	Wife of Ranjit Singh	Exiled

== See also ==
- Sikh state

== Sources ==
- Adams, Winthrop Lindsay (2010). "Alexander's Successors to 221 BC". In Roisman, Joseph; Worthington, Ian (eds.). A Companion to Ancient Macedonia. Oxford: Wiley-Blackwell. pp. 208–224. ISBN 978-1-4051-7936-2.
- Bosworth, C. E. (1977). The Later Ghaznavids: Splendour and Decay : the Dynasty in Afghanistan and Northern India, 1040-1186. ColumbiaUniversity Press. ISBN 978-0-231-04428-8.
- Bosworth, C.E. (1996). The New Islamic Dynasties: A Chronological and Genealogical Manual. New York City: Columbia University Press. ISBN 0-231-10714-5.
- Cribb, Joe; Donovan, Peter (2014). Kushan, Kushano-Sasanian, and Kidarite Coins A Catalogue of Coins From the American Numismatic Society by David Jongeward and Joe Cribb with Peter Donovan. p. 4.
- Errington, Robert Malcolm (1990). A History of Macedonia. Translated by Catherine Errington. Berkeley: University of California Press. ISBN 978-0-520-06319-8.
- Gilley, Dawn L.; Worthington, Ian (2010). "Alexander the Great, Macedonia and Asia". In Roisman, Joseph; Worthington, Ian (eds.). A Companion to Ancient Macedonia. Oxford: Wiley-Blackwell. pp. 186–207. ISBN 978-1-4051-7936-2.

|}
