= 185 BC =

185 BC in various calendars
- Gregorian calendar: 185 BC; CLXXXV BC
- Ab urbe condita: 569
- Ancient Egypt era: XXXIII dynasty, 139
- Pharaoh: Ptolemy V Epiphanes, 19
- Ancient Greek Olympiad (summer): 148th Olympiad, year 4
- Assyrian calendar: 4566
- Balinese saka calendar: N/A
- Bengali calendar: −778 – −777
- Berber calendar: 766
- Buddhist calendar: 360
- Burmese calendar: −822
- Byzantine calendar: 5324–5325
- Chinese calendar: 乙卯年 (Wood Rabbit); 2513 or 2306 — to — 丙辰年 (Fire Dragon); 2514 or 2307
- Coptic calendar: −468 – −467
- Discordian calendar: 982
- Ethiopian calendar: −192 – −191
- Hebrew calendar: 3576–3577
- Hindu calendars
- Vikram Samvat: −128 – −127
- Shaka Samvat: N/A
- Kali Yuga: 2916–2917
- Holocene calendar: 9816
- Iranian calendar: 806 BP – 805 BP
- Islamic calendar: 831 BH – 830 BH
- Javanese calendar: N/A
- Julian calendar: N/A
- Korean calendar: 2149
- Minguo calendar: 2096 before ROC 民前2096年
- Nanakshahi calendar: −1652
- Seleucid era: 127/128 AG
- Thai solar calendar: 358–359
- Tibetan calendar: ཤིང་མོ་ཡོས་ལོ་ (female Wood-Hare) −58 or −439 or −1211 — to — མེ་ཕོ་འབྲུག་ལོ་ (male Fire-Dragon) −57 or −438 or −1210

Year 185 BC was a year of the pre-Julian Roman calendar. At the time it was known as the Year of the Consulship of Pulcher and Puditanus (or, less frequently, year 569 Ab urbe condita). The denomination 185 BC for this year has been used since the early medieval period, when the Anno Domini calendar era became the prevalent method in Europe for naming years.

== Events ==
=== By place ===
==== Roman Republic ====
- The Roman general Scipio Africanus and his brother Lucius are accused by Cato the Elder and his supporters of having received bribes from the late Seleucid king Antiochus III. Scipio defies his accusers, reminds the Romans of their debt to him, and retires to his country house at Liternum in Campania. However, Cato is successful in breaking the political influence of Lucius Scipio and Scipio Africanus.

==== Egypt ====
- The civil war between the northern and southern areas of Egypt ends with the arrest of Ankmachis by the Ptolemaic general Conanus.

==== India ====
- Pushyamitra Shunga assassinates the Mauryan emperor Brhadrata, which brings an end to that dynasty, after which he founds the Shunga dynasty.

== Births ==
- Panaetius of Rhodes, Greek philosopher (d. 110 BC)
- Publius Cornelius Scipio Aemilianus, leading general and politician of the Roman Republic. As consul he will be the commander of the final siege and destruction of Carthage and will be the leader of the senators opposed to the Gracchi (d. 129 BC)

== Deaths ==
- Brhadrata, Indian emperor, last ruler of the Indian Mauryan dynasty (from 197 BC)
