= List of Maurya emperors =

Chakravarti of the Maurya Empire
- Imperial
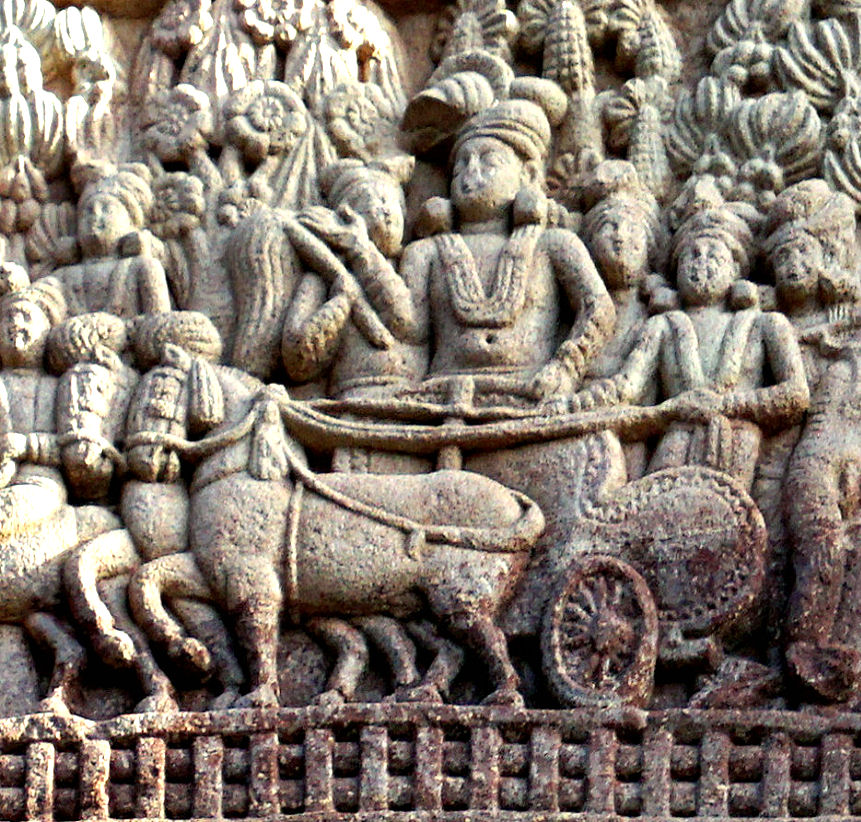
- Longest reign Ashoka the Great; 268 BCE – 232 BCE

Details
- Style: Devanampriya
- First monarch: Chandragupta Maurya
- Last monarch: Brihadratha Maurya
- Formation: 322 BCE
- Abolition: 185 BCE
- Residence: Pataliputra (322–185 BCE)
- Appointer: Hereditary
- Pretenders: Mauryas of Puri, Mori Rajputs

The Maurya Empire (c. 322–185 BCE) was an ancient Indian empire. The empire was founded by Chandragupta Maurya in 322 BCE and lasted until 185 BCE. The Mauryan Empire was the first pan-Indian empire. At its height, the empire covered most of the Indian subcontinent. The Mauryan Emperor was the monarchical head of state and wielded absolute rule over the empire. Chandragupta's chief minister Chanakya, sometimes called Kautilya, advised Chandragupta Maurya and contributed to the empire's legacy. Bindusara, Chandragupta's son, assumed the throne around 297 BCE. He kept the empire running smoothly while maintaining its lands. Bindusara's son, Ashoka, was the third leader of the Mauryan Empire. Ashoka left his mark on history by erecting large stone pillars inscribed with edicts that he issued. After Ashoka's death, his family continued to reign, but the empire began to break apart. The last of the Mauryas, Brihadratha, was assassinated by his Senapati, Pushyamitra Shunga who went on to found the Shunga Empire in 185 BCE.

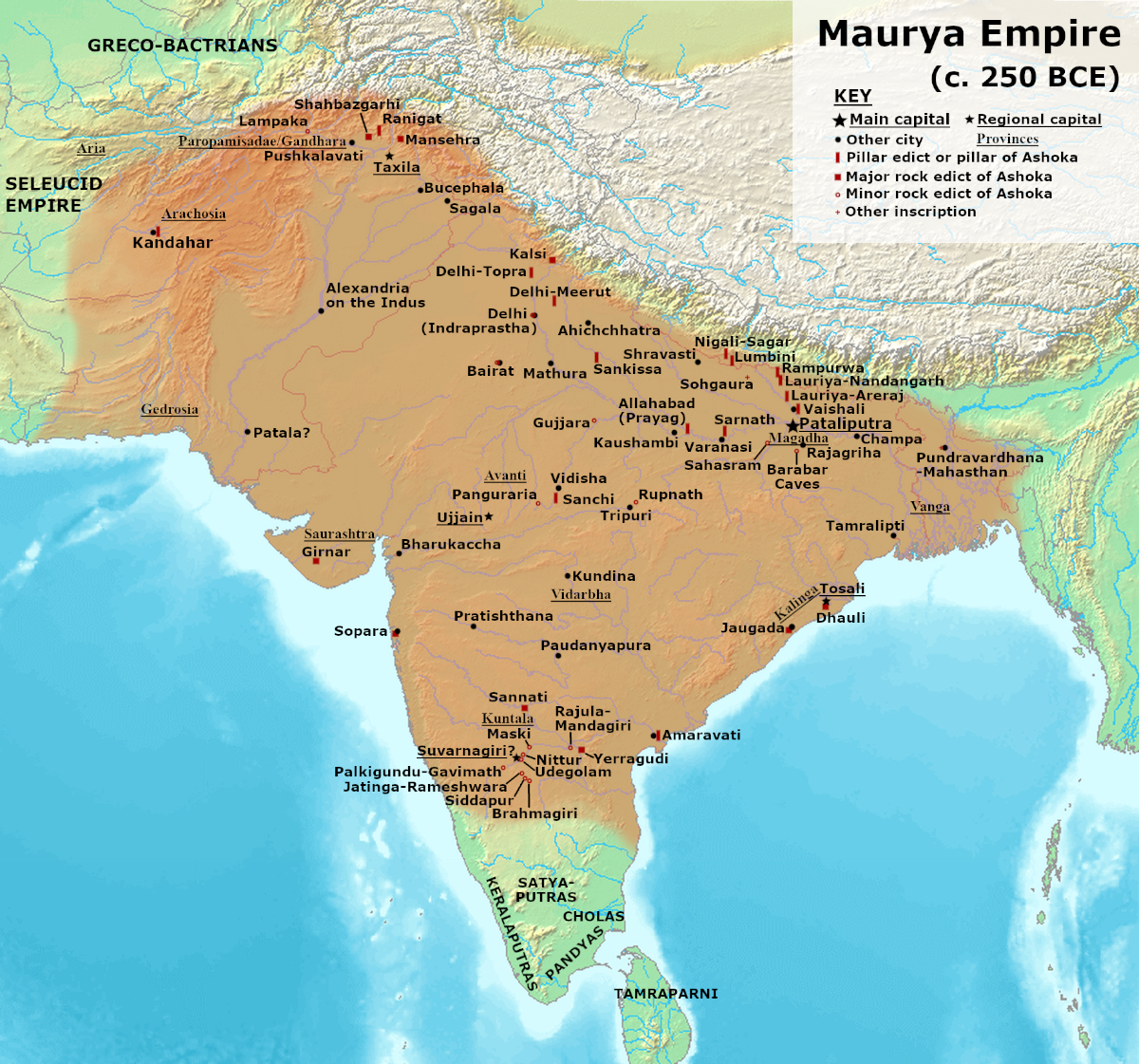
Maurya Empire at its greatest expansion, c. 250 BCE

== List of emperors ==
Ruler	Reign	Notes
Chandragupta Maurya (𑀙𑀦𑁆𑀤𑁆𑀭𑀕𑀼𑀧𑁆𑀢𑀸 𑀫𑀸𑀉𑀭𑁆𑀬𑀸)	322–297 BCE	Founder of the Maurya Empire.
Bindusara (𑀩𑀺𑀦𑁆𑀤𑀼𑀲𑀸𑀭𑀸)	297–273 BCE	Known for his foreign diplomacy and crushing of the Vidarbha revolt.
Ashoka (𑀅𑀰𑁄𑀓𑀸)	268–232 BCE	Greatest emperor of the dynasty. His son Kunala was blinded and died before his father. Ashoka was succeeded by his grandson. Also known for Kalinga War victory.
Dasharatha Maurya (𑀤𑀰𑀭𑀣 𑀫𑀸𑀉𑀭𑁆𑀬𑀸)	232–224 BCE	Grandson of Ashoka.
Samprati (𑀲𑀫𑁆𑀧𑁆𑀭𑀢𑀻)	224–215 BCE	Cousin of Dasharatha.
Shalishuka (𑀰𑀸𑀮𑀻𑀰𑀼𑀓𑀸)	215–202 BCE	
Devavarman (𑀤𑁂𑀯𑀯𑀭𑁆𑀫𑀦𑁆)	202–195 BCE	
Shatadhanvan (𑀰𑀢𑀥𑀦𑁆𑀯𑀦𑁆)	195–187 BCE	The Mauryan Empire had shrunk by the time of his reign
Brihadratha (𑀩𑁆𑀭𑀺𑀳𑀤𑁆𑀭𑀣𑀸)	187–184 BCE	Assassinated and overthrown by his General Pushyamitra Shunga in 185 BCE.

== Family tree ==
Family tree of Maurya Emperors

Chandragupta; Maurya^{(1)} r. 324/1-297 BCE
Bindusara; Amitraghata^{(2)} r. 297-273 BCE
Ashoka the Great^{(3)} r. 268-232 BCE
Tivala	Kunala
Dasharatha^{(4)} r. 232-224 BCE	Samprati^{(5)} r. 224-215 BCE
Shalishuka^{(6)} r. 215-202 BCE
Devavarman^{(7)} r. 202-195 BCE
Shatadhanvan^{(8)} r. 195-187 BCE
Brihadratha^{(9)} r. 187-185 BCE

== See also ==
- Magadha
- History of India
- List of largest empires
- List of Gupta emperors
- List of Indian monarchs
