= Shalishuka =

Mauryan emperor from 215 to 202 BCE

Shalishuka शालिशुक
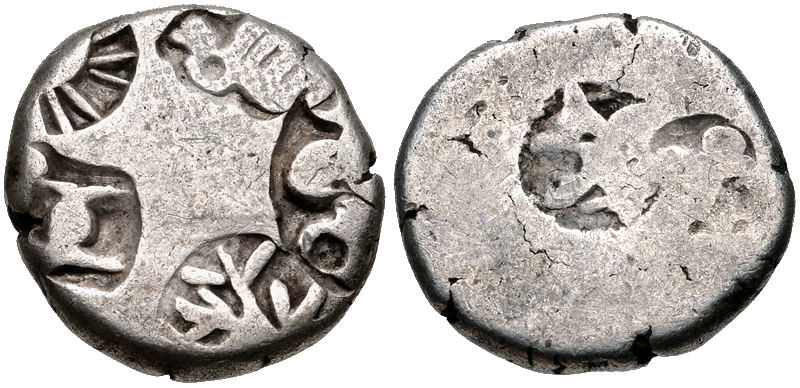
- Coin of Emperor Salisuka, or later, c. 207–194 BCE.

Emperor of Magadha
- Reign: c. 215 – c. 202 BCE
- Predecessor: Samprati
- Successor: Devavarman
- Born: Unknown; Pataliputra, Maurya Empire(Present day Bihar, India)
- Died: c. 202 BCE; Pataliputra, Maurya Empire(Present day Bihar, India)
- Dynasty: Maurya
- Father: Samprati
- Religion: Jainism

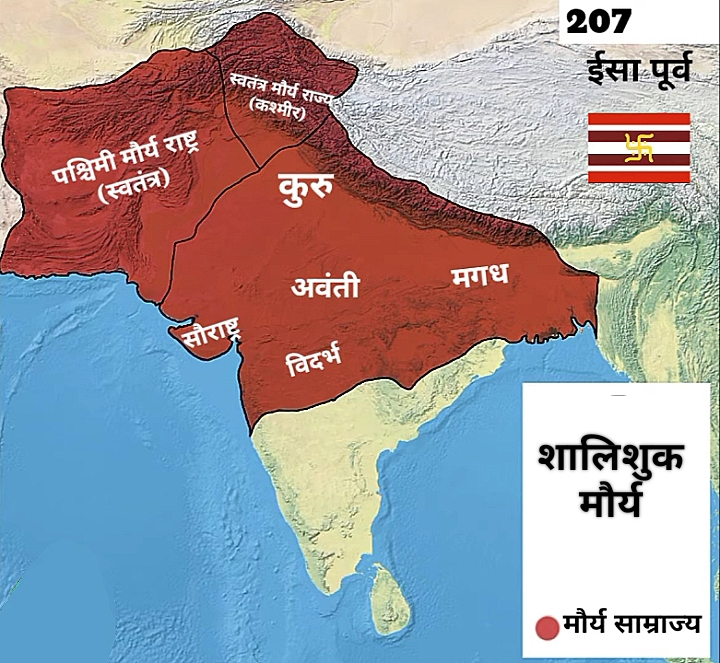
Possible extent of Maurya Empire under Shalishuka

Shalishuka (IAST: Śāliśuka) Maurya was the 6th Emperor of the Indian Maurya dynasty. He ruled from 215–202 BCE. He was the successor and son of Samprati Maurya. While the Yuga Purana section of the Gargi Samhita mentions him as a quarrelsome, unrighteous ruler, he is also noted as being of "righteous words"

44. In that beautiful Puṣpapura (flower city), occupied by fewer than a hundred kings, there will be Śāliśūka, born for the destruction of the truth, the offspring of karma (fate).
45. That king, the offspring of karma, cheerful-minded [yet] fond of conflict, [will be] an oppressor of his own kingdom, of righteous speech but unrighteous conduct;

— Yuga Purana

== Succession ==
According to the Puranas he was succeeded by Devavarman.
