= Devavarman (Maurya) =

Mauryan emperor from 202 to 195 BCE

Devavarman देववर्मन

Emperor of Magadha
- Reign: c. 202 – c. 195 BCE
- Predecessor: Shalishuka
- Successor: Shatadhanvan
- Born: Unknown; Pataliputra, Maurya Empire (Present day Bihar, India)
- Died: c. 195 BCE; Pataliputra, Maurya Empire (Present day Bihar, India)
- Dynasty: Maurya

Devavarman (or Devadharman) was the 7th Emperor of the Maurya Empire. He ruled in the period 202–195 BCE. According to the Puranas, he was the successor of Shalishuka Maurya and reigned for a short period of seven years. He was not righteous, just, powerful and kind like his predecessor, Shalishuka. He was succeeded by Shatadhanvan. He is mentioned as Somaśarmā in the Bhāgavata Purāṇa.

== Notes ==
Devavarman (Maurya) Maurya Dynasty
Preceded by Shalishuka	Maurya Emperor; 202–195 BCE	Succeeded by Shatadhanvan
