= Shatadhanvan =

Mauryan emperor from 195 to 187 BCE

- Chakravartin

Emperor of Magadha
- Reign: c. 195 – c. 187 BCE
- Coronation: 195 BCE
- Predecessor: Devavarman
- Successor: Brihadratha Maurya
- Born: c. 224 BCE; Thanesar, Maurya Empire (Present-day Haryana, India)
- Died: c. 187 BCE; Patliputra, Maurya Empire (Present-day Bihar, India)
Names
- Shatadhanvan Maurya
- Dynasty: Maurya
- Father: Devavarman

Shatadhanvan (IAST: Śatadhanvan) or Shatadhanus was the 8th Emperor of the Maurya dynasty. He ruled from 195 to 187 BCE. According to the Puranas, he was the successor of Devavarman Maurya and reigned for eight years. He was succeeded by his son Brihadratha Maurya.
