= Brihadratha Maurya =

Mauryan emperor from 187 to 185 BCE

Emperor of Magadha
- Reign: c. 187 – c. 185 or 180 BCE
- Predecessor: Shatadhanvan
- Successor: Pushyamitra Shunga (as Shunga emperor)
- Born: Unknown; Pataliputra, Maurya Empire (Present-day Bihar, India)
- Died: c. 185 or 180 BCE; Pataliputra, Maurya Empire (Present-day Bihar, India)
- Dynasty: Maurya Empire

Brihadratha Maurya was the 9th and the last Emperor of the Mauryan Empire. He ruled from 187 to 185 BCE, when he was overthrown and assassinated by his general, Pushyamitra Shunga, who went on to establish the Shunga Empire. The Mauryan territories, centred on the capital of Pataliputra, had shrunk considerably from the time of Ashoka to when Brihadratha came to the throne.

== Reign ==
According to the Puranas, Brihadratha succeeded his father Shatadhanvan to the throne and ruled for seven years.

=== Overthrow by Pushyamitra Shunga ===
Brihadratha Maurya the last Mauryan Emperor was killed between 185 and 180 BCE and power usurped by his general, Pushyamitra Shunga who then took over the throne and established the Shunga Empire. Bāṇabhaṭṭa's Harshacharita says that Pushyamitra, while parading the entire Mauryan Army before Brihadratha on the pretext of showing him the strength of the army, crushed his master. Pushyamitra killed the former emperor in front of his military and established himself as the new ruler.

=== Invasion of Demetrius I ===
Between 190 and 186 BCE, before the assassination of Brihadratha by his army chief Pushyamitra, Greco-Bactrian king Demetrius (Dharmamita) invaded northwestern India (parts of modern-day Afghanistan and Pakistan) and occupied it. The Mauryans had diplomatic alliances with the Greeks, and they may have been considered as allies by the Greco-Bactrians. A key detail is mentioned by Sri Lankan monks in the Paramparapustaka chronicle, pointing that Brihadratha married Demetrius' daughter, Berenice (Suvarnnaksi in Pali language). The Greco-Bactrians may also have invaded India in order to protect Greek populations in the subcontinent. He established his rule in the Kabul Valley and parts of the Punjab region. Soon, however, they had to leave for Bactria to fight a fierce battle (probably between Eucratides I and Demetrius).

The hypothesized Yavana invasion of Pataliputra is based in the Yuga Purana. The scripture describes the campaign of King Dharmamita:

47. Then, having approached Saketa, together with the Panchalas and Mathura, the Yavanas (Indo-Greeks), wicked and valiant, will reach Kusumadhvaja ("The city of the flower-standard", Pataliputra).
48. Then, once Puspapura (Pataliputra) has been reached, [and] its celebrated mud[-walls] cast down, all the realms will be in disorder, there is no doubt.
49. There will then finally be a great war, of wooden weapons, and there will be the vilest of men, dishonourable and unrighteous.

— Yuga Purana

== See also ==
- Magadha
- Maurya Empire
- Shunga Empire

Brihadratha Maurya Maurya Empire
Preceded by Shatadhanvan	Maurya Emperor; 187–185	Succeeded by Pushyamitra (Shunga Empire)
