= Veer Kunal =

1945 Hindi historical fiction film

- Kishore Sahu and Shobhana Samarth in Veer Kunal from Filmindia
- Directed by: Kishore Sahu
- Produced by: Kishore Sahu
- Starring: Kishore Sahu; Shobhna Samarth; Durga Khote; Mubarak
- Cinematography: Chandu
- Edited by: Kantilal B Shukla
- Music by: Khan Mastana
- Production company: Ramnik Productions
- Release date: 1945
- Country: India
- Language: Hindi

Veer Kunal (Valiant Kunal) also called Son Of Ashoka is a 1945 Hindi historical fiction film directed by Kishore Sahu. Besides directing the film Sahu also produced it and wrote the story and screenplay. The cinematographer was Chandu. Produced under the Ramnik Productions banner, it had music by Khan Mastana. The starcast consisted of Kishore Sahu, Shobhna Samarth, Durga Khote, Mubarak and Maya Banerji.

The film based on popular historical folk myth, focuses on Emperor Ashoka's son, Kunal. Ashoka has brought in a third wife, who through her evil planning has Kunal blinded and thrown in the dungeons. The story then follows episodes in Kunal's life till he gets Ashoka's impartial justice.

== Plot ==
Emperor Ashoka's beloved wife, Asandhimitra, mother of Kunal, is dead and Ashoka is grief-stricken. Kunal is much loved by his step-mother, Karuvaki. He is loved and admired by all in the kingdom and is Ashoka's favourite son. Over a period of time Ashoka overcomes his grief and marries a much younger, Tishyarakshita, daughter of a chieftain. Somdev, Ashoka's Prime Minister has opposed the alliance and is frequently humiliated by Tishya. When Tishya sees Kunal, she falls in love with him in spite of him having a wife, Kanchanmala, and a young son. Tishya is strongly rebuffed by Kunal. An angry Tishya has him accused of murder and put in the dungeon. She tells the guards to blind his eyes. Ashoka, enamoured of Tishya, is unable to see through her plotting. He falls ill and remains largely unaware of most incidents. Kurvaki, unable to see Kunal's plight, helps him escape. Kunal gets the help of the townspeople of Pataliputra and marches to the palace. Ashoka, on being told who is at the gates of the palace, calls for a durbar meeting. When he hears the entire story, his sense of fair play, his impartial justice, and remorse at his son's blinding help him mete out a strict punishment to Tishya, condemning her to be burnt.

== Cast ==
- Kishore Sahu
- Shobhna Samarth as Tishyarakshita
- Durga Khote as Kuruvaki
- Mubarak as Ashok
- Maya Banerji
- Nila Nagini as Kanchanmala, wife of Kunal
- Vasantrao Pahelwan
- Moni Chatterjee
- Kanta Kumari

== Reception ==
Kishore Sahu "made news" by getting Sardar Vallabhbhai Patel to inaugurate the film premiere at Novelty cinema in Bombay on 1 December 1945, according to the magazine Filmindia. Some of the comments from other newspapers of the time were quoted in Filmindia in an advertisement praising the film. The Bombay Chronicle praised its sets and costumes. The Sunday Standard called it the "greatest picture". The Free Press Journal explained its popularity due to "high level of performances" and Sahu's direction. The Times of India, while acclaiming Sahu's direction also gave credit to the acting, sets, photography, and a tight "gripping" story.

Filmindia commended Sahu for casting Shobhana Samarth as the "vamp", which was in contrast to majority of her roles where she portrayed Sita, Damayanti and Taramati in several films. Her acting was appreciated and was referred to as her "best performance". Sahu, Samarth and Durga Khote's performances were much-admired. Mubarak as Ashok was criticised for looking "stupid and unconvincing", while Nila Nagini was cited as having an "ungainly appearance". The symbolic use of eyes which attract Tishya, and her blinding Kunal, were highly praised by Patel, finding the thematic approach far superior. The film was criticised for being overly serious and "bordering on morbidity". The production values were stated to be inconsistent.

The "expensive picture" was cited as being "more for the intellectuals than for the masses", however, it was claimed to be a success at the box-office.

== Kunal In Films ==
- In Hindi, Veer Kunal (1945) was the third film on the subject of Ashoka's son, Kunal. The earlier two were Veer Kunal (1925), a silent film directed by Manilal Joshi, and Veer Kunal (1932), a Talkie directed by M. D. Bhavnani and G. S. Devare.
- In Tamil, the subject was made as Ashok Kumar (1941) directed by the "noted" film maker Raja Chandrasekhar. It starred the famous M. K. Thyagaraja Bhagavathar as Kunal and the film is remembered for Bhagavathar's "melodious songs". It was a commercial success.

== Soundtrack ==
The film had only four songs, and all of them according to Baburao Patel, were in keeping with the mood and theme of the film, and not frivolous. The film had music by Khan Mastana. The three lyricists were Ambikesh Kuntal, Neelkanth Tiwari and Pandit Madhur.

=== Song list ===
#	Title	Lyricist
1	"Chalo Milkar Chale"	Ambikesh Kuntal
2	"Ghir Aaye Re Patang"	Neelkanth Tiwari
3	"Mere Nainon Ke Taare"	Neelkanth Tiwari
4	"Veena Aisa Raag Suna De"	Pandit Madhur
