= Pushyamitra Shunga =

Shunga Emperor from 185 to 149 BCE

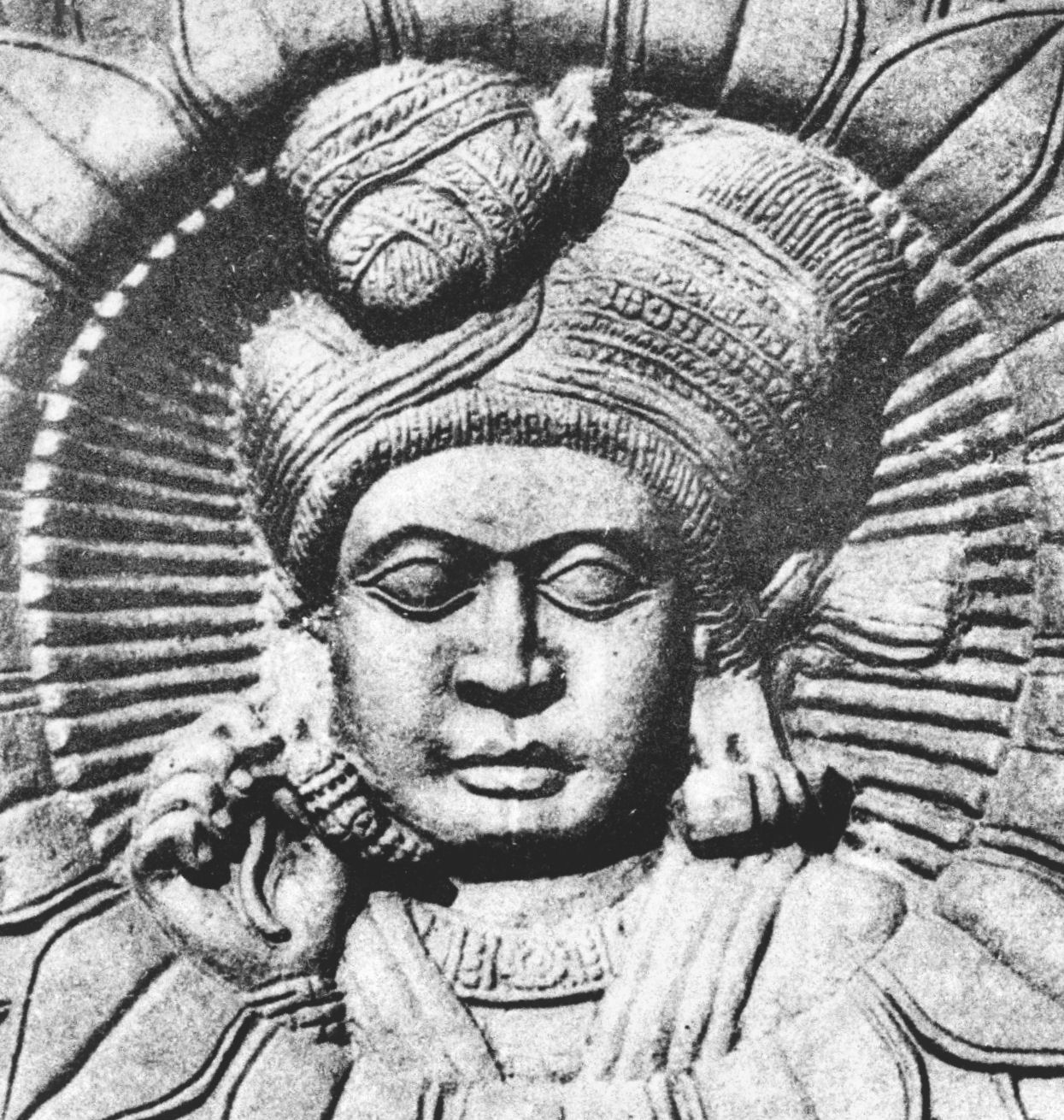
- Sunga period masculine figurine, 2nd-1st century BCE, Guimet Museum

Emperor of Magadha
- Reign: c. 185 – c. 149 BCE
- Predecessor: Brihadratha Maurya (as Mauryan emperor)
- Successor: Agnimitra

General of Magadha
- Born: c. late 3rd century BCE; Magadha, Maurya Empire (present-day Bihar, India)
- Died: c. 149 BCE; Pataliputra, Shunga Empire (present-day Bihar, India)
- Dynasty: Shunga
- Religion: Hinduism

Pushyamitra Shunga (IAST: Puṣyamitra Śuṅga; reigned c. 185 – c. 149 BCE), also known as Pushpamitra Shunga (IAST: Puṣpamitra Śuṅga) was the founder and the first ruler of the Shunga Empire which he established to succeed the Maurya Empire.

Pushyamitra's association with the Brahmanical tradition is displayed by his performance of the Vedic Ashvamedha sacrifice as recorded in the Dhanadeva Ayodhya inscription.

Though Buddhist texts claim that Pushyamitra persecuted Buddhists, past and contemporary scholars have rejected these claims.

== Name ==
According to John E Mitchiner, Pushyamitra original name was Puṣpaka or Puṣpamitra and the confusion between Puṣyamitra and Puṣpamitra arose because of the erroneous readings of 'p' and 'y' in the manuscripts. His interpretation is largely inspired by the Yuga Purāṇa.

H. C. Raychaudhuri theorized that the name "Shunga" is derived from the Sanskrit word for the fig tree.

== Founding of the Shunga Empire ==
Pushyamitra Shunga founded the Shunga Empire after assassinating the last Mauryan emperor Brihadratha Maurya. According to Vicharasreni of Merutunga, Pushyamitra or Pushpamitra got his throne in 204 BC.

Subsequently, he drove out the Greeks with the Shunga–Greek War and ruled for 36 years.

The Buddhist text Ashokavadana names Pushyamitra as the last Mauryan emperor.

Sampadin's son was Bṛhaspati who, in turn, had a son named Vṛṣasena, and Vṛṣasena had a son named Puṣyadharman, and Pusyadharman begot Pusyamitra...... With the death of Pusyamitra, the Mauryan lineage came to an end.
--Aśokāvadāna

This text appears to have confused Brihadratha with Pushyamitra.

Pushyamitra is recorded to have performed the Ashvamedha ritual to legitimize his right to rule.

Inscriptions of the Shungas have been found as far as the Ayodhya (the Dhanadeva–Ayodhya inscription), and the Divyavadana mentions that his empire stretched as far as Sakala (now Sialkot) in Punjab region, now in Pakistan.

== Alleged persecution of Buddhists ==
=== Buddhist accounts ===
Buddhist texts claim that Pushyamitra cruelly persecuted the Buddhists. The earliest source to mention this is the 4-5th Century CE text Ashokavadana (a part of Divyavadana). According to this account, Pushyamitra (described as the last Mauryan emperor) wanted to be famous. His ministers advised him that as long as Buddhism remained the dominant faith, he would never be as famous as his ancestor Ashoka, who had commissioned 84,000 stupas. One advisor told him that he could become famous by destroying Buddhism. Pushyamitra then tried to destroy the Kukkutarama monastery, but it was saved by chance. He then proceeded to Shakala in the north-west, where he offered a prize of one hundred Roman denarii (coins) for every head of a Buddhist monk brought to him. Next, he proceeded to the Koshthaka kingdom, where a Buddhist yaksha named Damshtranivasin killed him and his army with help of another yaksha named Krimisha.

... Pushyamitra equipped a fourfold army, and intending to destroy the Buddhist religion, he went to the Kukkutarama (in Pataliputra). ... Pushyamitra therefore destroyed the sangharama, killed the monks there, and departed. ... After some time, he arrived in Sakala, and proclaimed that he would give a ... reward to whoever brought him the head of a Buddhist monk.

Like other portions of the text, these accounts are regarded by many historians as being exaggerated.

Vibhasa, another 2nd century text, states that Pushyamitra burned Buddhist scriptures, killed Buddhist monks, and destroyed 500 monasteries in and around Kashmir. In this campaign, he was supported by yakshas, kumbhandas, and other demons. However, when he reached the Bodhi tree, the deity of that tree took the form of a beautiful woman and killed him. Shariputrapariprichha, translated into Chinese between 317 and 420 CE also mentions this legend, but this particular version is more detailed, and describes eastern India (not Kashmir) as the center of Pushyamitra's anti-Buddhist campaign.

The medieval-era Arya-Manjushri-Mula-Kalpa mentions a wicked and foolish king named Gomimukhya ("cattle-faced"), or Gomishanda ("Gomin, the bull"), who seized the territory from the east to Kashmir, destroying monasteries and killing monks. Ultimately, he and his officers were killed in the north by falling mountain rocks. This king is identified with Pushyamitra by Jayantanuja Bandyopadhyaya.

The 16th-century Tibetan Buddhist historian Taranatha also states that Pushyamitra and his allies killed Buddhist monks and destroyed monasteries from madhyadesha (midland) to Jalandhara. These activities wiped out the Buddhist doctrine from the north, within five years.

=== Authenticity of Buddhist claims ===
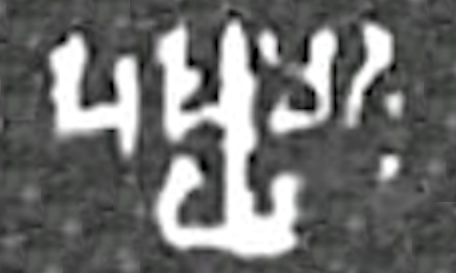
The name "Pushyamitra" (Brahmi script: 𑀧𑀼𑀰𑁆𑀬𑀫𑀺𑀢𑁆𑀭) in the Ayodhya Inscription of Dhana.

Based on Buddhist tradition, some scholars believe that Pushyamitra was indeed a persecutor of the Buddhist faith. However, others believe that Buddhist scholars were biased against Pushyamitra, because he did not patronize them. According to archaeologist John Marshall, there is evidence of some damage to Buddhist establishments at Takshashila around the time of Shunga rule. He also theorized that the Sanchi stupa was vandalized in 2nd century BCE (that is, during Pushyamitra's reign), before being rebuilt on a larger scale. G. R. Sharma, who excavated the Buddhist ruins at Kaushambi, suggested that the destruction of the local monastery might have happened during the reign of Pushyamitra Shunga. P. K. Mishra believes that the damage to the Deur Kothar stupa is also datable to Pushyamitra's period. H. C. Raychaudhari pointed out that Buddhist monuments were constructed at Bharhut during the Shunga rule. However, according to N. N. Ghosh, these were constructed during the reign of later Shunga rulers, not Pushyamitra's period.

H. Bhattacharya theorized that Pushyamitra might have persecuted Buddhists for political, rather than religious, reasons: the politically active Buddhists probably supported the Indo-Greek rivals of Pushyamitra, which might have prompted him to persecute them. The Ashokavadana states that Pushyamitra declared a reward for killing Buddhist monks in Shakala (present-day Sialkot), which was located near the Indo-Greek frontiers. According to K. P. Jayaswal, this further highlights a political motivation behind his alleged persecution of Buddhists.

Others have expressed skepticism about the Buddhist claims of persecution by Pushyamitra. Étienne Lamotte points out that the Buddhist legends are not consistent about the location of Pushyamitra's anti-Buddhist campaign and his death. The Ashokavadana claims that Pushyamitra offered Roman dinaras as a reward for killing Buddhist monks, but the dinara did not come into general circulation in India before the 1st century BCE. Ashokavadana also claims that Ashoka persecuted Nirgranthas (Ajivikas), which some assert is a fabrication, considering that Ashoka's edicts express tolerance towards all religious sects. The Sri Lankan Buddhist text Mahavamsa suggests that several monasteries existed in present-day Bihar, Awadh and Malwa at the time Pushyamitra's contemporary Dutthagamani ruled in Lanka. This suggests that these monasteries survived Pushyamitra Shunga's reign.

H. C. Raychaudhury argued that Pushyamitra's overthrow of the Mauryans cannot be considered as a Brahmin uprising against Buddhist rule, as Brahmins did not suffer during the Mauryan rule: Ashoka's edicts mention the Brahmins before Shramanas, and the appointment of a Brahmin general (Pushyamitra) shows that the Brahmins were honoured at the Mauryan court. The fact that the Ashokavadana mentions Pushyamitra as a Mauryan further erodes its historical credibility, and weakens the hypothesis that he persecuted Buddhists because he was a Brahmin. Raychaudhury also argued that according to Malavikagnimitra, a Buddhist nun named Bhagavati Kaushiki attended Pushyamitra's court, which indicates that they did not persecute Buddhists. However, Shankar Goyal states that there is no evidence of Kaushiki being a Buddhist nun.

Historian Eric Seldeslachts states that there is "no proof whatsoever that Pushyamitra actually persecuted the Buddhists" though he may not have actively supported the Buddhists, invoking the Buddhist wrath.

Romila Thapar writes that the lack of concrete archaeological evidence casts doubt on the claims of Buddhist persecution by Pushyamitra.

It is possible that the Buddhist influence at the Mauryan court declined during Pushyamitra's reign, and the Buddhist monasteries and other institutions stopped receiving royal patronage. This change might have led to discontent among the Buddhists, resulting in exaggerated accounts of persecution.

Michael Witzel states that Manu Smriti, which emphasizes the role of orthodox faith in state-craft and society, was first compiled under Pushyamitra's rule. According to Kaushik Roy, it was a Brahmanical reaction to the rise of Buddhism and Jainism.

=== Accounts against persecution ===
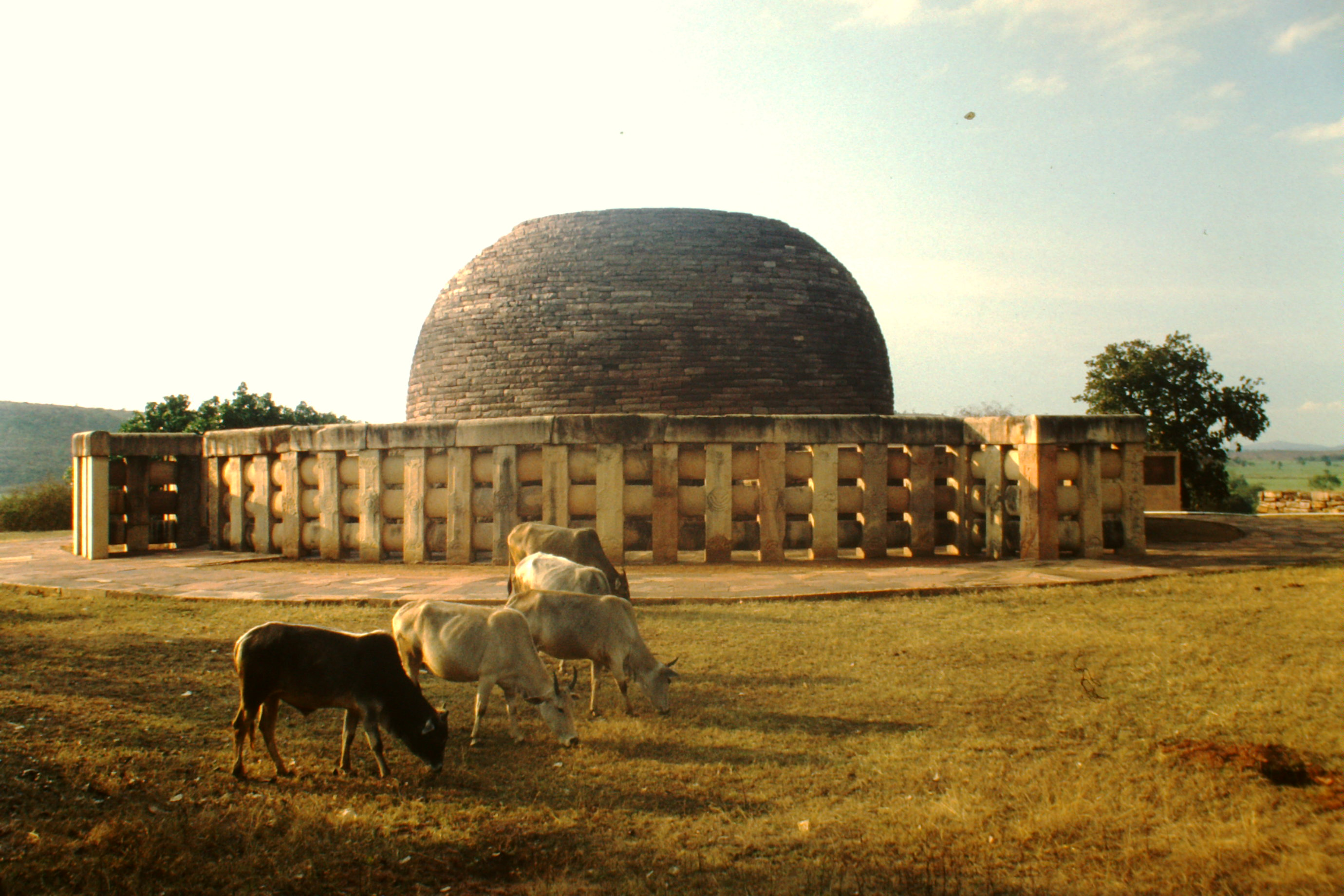
Shunga period stupa No. 2 at Sanchi.

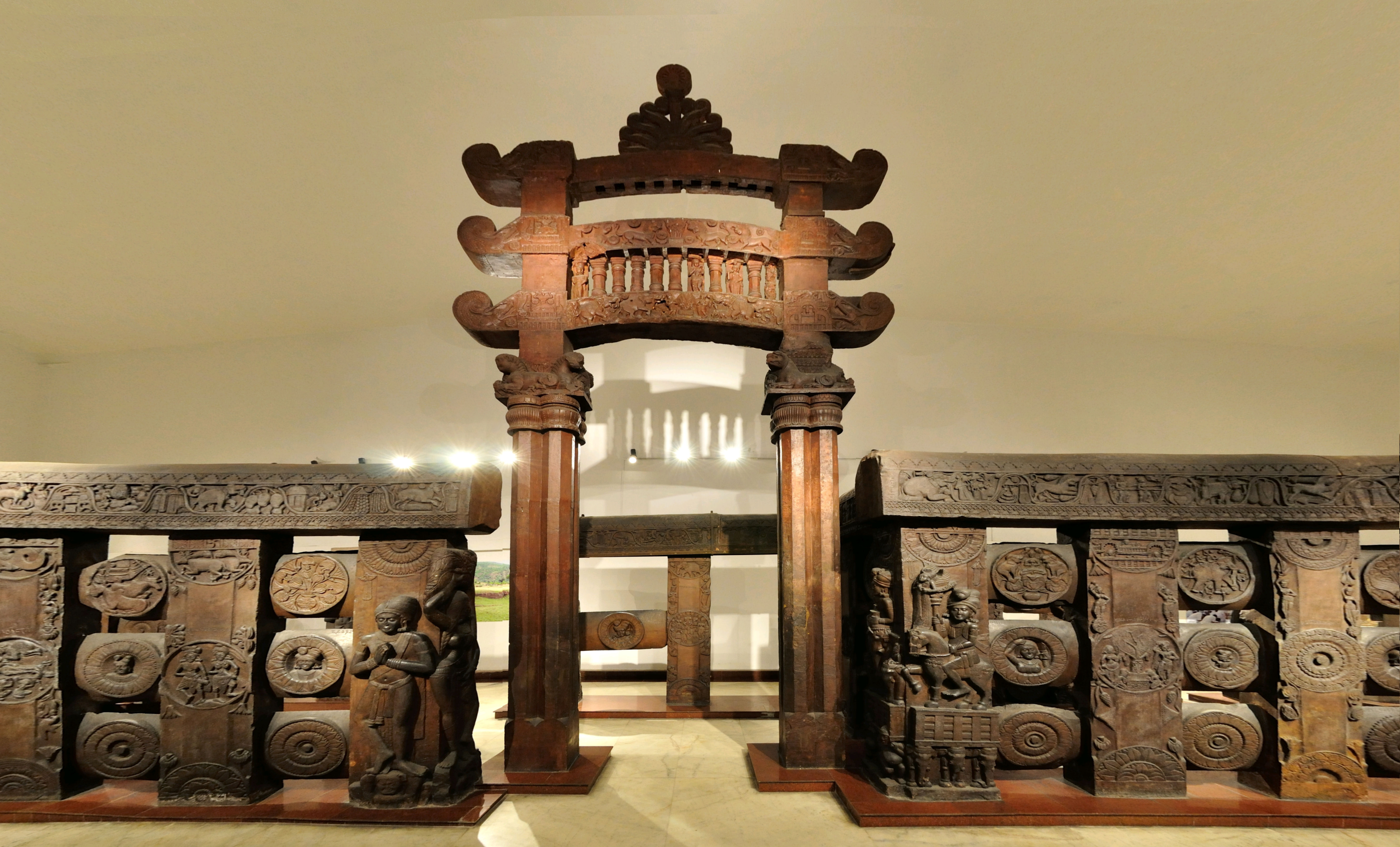
East Gateway and Railings, Red Sandstone, Bharhut Stupa, 2nd century BCE. Indian Museum, Kolkata.

Shunga emperors were seen as amenable to Buddhism and as having contributed to the building of the stupa at Bharhut. During his reign the Buddhist monuments of Bharhut and Sanchi were renovated and further improved. There is enough evidence to show that Pushyamitra patronised buddhist art.

== Succession of the throne ==
Pushyamitra Shunga was succeeded in 148 BCE by his son Agnimitra.

== In literature ==
Pushyamitra Shunga's history is recorded in the Harshacharita authored by Bāṇabhaṭṭa.

Sunga Inscription from Ayodhya by Rai Bahadur Daya Ram Saini describes the association of Pushyamitra with the Brahmanical tradition through his practice of Vedic Ashvamedha sacrifice.

== See also ==
- History of Buddhism
- Indo-Greeks

Preceded by Mauryan Dynasty; Brihadratha Maurya	King of Shunga Dynasty; 185–149 BCE	Succeeded by Agnimitra
