= Greek invasion =

Greek invasion may refer to:

- The Wars of Alexander the Great
  - The Greek invasion of India as part of the Indian campaign of Alexander the Great
- The Greek invasion of India as part of the Shunga–Greek War
- The Greek invasion of Anatolia as part of the Greco-Turkish War (1919–1922)
  - The Greek invasion of Izmir as part of the Greek landing at Smyrna

== See also ==
- Greek invasion of India (disambiguation)
