= Sangharama =

Sangharama (Sanskrit: संघाराम Saṃghārāma) refers to a "temple" or "monastery." It is the place, including its garden or grove, where the Sangha, the Buddhist monastic community dwells. A famous sanghārāma was that of Kukkuṭārāma in Pāṭaliputra. The Kukkutura sanghārāma was later destroyed and its monks killed by Puṣyamitra of Mauryan lineage, according to the second century Aśokāvadāna. "Then King Pushyamitra equipped a fourfold army, and intending to destroy the Buddhist religion, he went to the Kukkutarama. (...) Pushyamitra therefore destroyed the sanghārāma, killed the monks there, and departed."

In East Asia, it was written as "僧伽藍摩" and shortened to "伽藍" (pronounced Qiélán in Chinese, Garam in Korean, and Garan in Japanese).
