= Jabali =

Character in the Hindu epic Ramayana

- Ramayana character
- Created by: Valmiki
- Alias: Javali
- Gender: Male
- Occupation: Priest, Dasharatha's advisor

Jabali (Sanskrit: जाबालि, romanized: Jābāli) is a character in the ancient Indian epic Ramayana. A learned Brahmin priest and an advisor of King Dasharatha, he unsuccessfully tries to persuade Rama to give up his exile, using rational arguments.

== Attempt to persuade Rama ==
In Ramayana, Rama abandons his claim to the royal throne and goes on a 14-year exile, in order to fulfill his father's promise. Rama considers his decision as his dharma (righteous duty), necessary for his father's honour. In Ayodhya Khanda, Jabali accompanies Bharata to the forest, as part of a group that tries to convince Rama to give up his exile and return.

Jabali uses nihilistic and atheistic reasoning to dissuade Rama from continuing the exile. He states that those give up artha (material pleasures) for the sake of dharma suffer in this life and meet extinction after their death. Showing further disbelief in the concept of afterlife, he criticizes the shraddha ritual, in which people offer food to their dead ancestors. He calls it a wastage of food, and sarcastically suggests that if food eaten by one person at a given place could nourish another person at another place, shraddha should be conducted for those going on long journeys, so they would not need to eat anything. However, even after listening to the arguments of Jabali and others, Rama refuses to give up his exile. He instead extols the virtues of following the dharma.

== Rama's response ==
Valmiki's Ramayana contains a section that describes Rama angrily denouncing Jabali, which includes the following verses:

Ramayana (2:109:34)

निन्दाम्यहं कर्म पितुः कृतं त ।
द्यस्त्वामगृह्णाद्विषमस्थबुद्धिम् ।
बुद्ध्यानयैवंविधया चरन्तं ।
सुनास्तिकं धर्मपथादपेतम् ।। (2-109-33)

यथा हि चोरः स तथा हि बुद्ध |
स्तथागतं नास्तिकमत्र विध्हि |
तस्माद्धि यः शङ्क्यतमः प्रजानाम् |
न नास्ति केनाभिमुखो बुधः स्यात् (2-109-34)

Translation by Ralph T. H. Griffith

My father's thoughtless act I chide
That gave thee honoured place,
Whose soul, from virtue turned aside,
Is faithless, dark, and base.

We rank the Buddhist with the thief,
And all the impious crew
Who share his sinful disbelief,
And hate the right and true.
Hence never should wise kings who seek
To rule their people well,
Admit, before their face to speak,
The cursed infidel. (2-109-34)

Translation by Shyam Ranganathan

I denounce the action mentioned below, of my father, who picked up you as his councilor-priest, a staunch unbeliever, who has not only stayed away from the path of dharma but whose mind is set on a wrong path opposed to the Vedic path, nay who is moving about in this world with such an ideology conforming to the doctrine of Chaarvaaka, who believes only in the world of senses as has been set forth in your foregoing speech.

It is a well-known fact that a follower of Buddha deserves to be punished precisely as a thief [because such a heretic robs people of their faith in a Vedically moral universe]; and know a nastika to be on a par with a Buddhist.

Translation by D. H. Rao & K. M. K. Murthy
I accuse the act done by my father in taking you into his service, you with your misleading intelligence, a firm atheist fallen from the true path. (2-109-33)

It is an exact state of the case that a mere thought deserves to be punished as it were a thief and know an atheist to be on par with a mere intellectual. Therefore, he is the most suspect, and should be punished in the interest of the people. In no case should a wise man consort with an atheist. (2-109-34)

In these and subsequent verses, Rama becomes so angry that he denounces his own father for keeping Jabali as an adviser. He accuses Jabali of being an atheist, and states that those following the nastika path deserve to be punished. In the subsequent verses, he emphasizes the importance of following the dharma. Jabali then retracts his statements, saying that he was merely arguing like a nihilist to convince Rama to come back, but he is not actually a nihilist. Vashistha supports Jabali, stating that he was speaking in the interest of Rama. Where as some other versions of ramayana suggest that he was a supporter of maharishi jabali. and was always trying to gain the knowledge of renouncing worldly pleasures by just leaving them

== Interpolation ==
The verses depicting Rama's anger are considered a later insertion in Valimiki's original text. Every canto of Ramayana ends with one long shloka written in a different metre, compared to the other verses. However, the version of the canto containing these verses contains six long shlokas in a different metre. The dialogue between Rama and Jabali is finished in the first shloka, in which Rama is not depicted as annoyed. However, the next few shlokas re-open the dialogue abruptly, and the tone of the conversation contradicts the tone of the earlier dialogue. In his translation, Griffith calls these lines "manifestly spurious" and cautions that these need to be "regarded with suspicion". August Wilhelm Schlegel, who translated Ramayana to German (1829), also called these lines fake, and later regretted having included them in his translation.

According to Jayantanuja Bandyopadhyaya, Rama's outburst against Jabali in these verses is an example of "Brahmanical counteroffensive against all anti-Vedic ideals and movements". Although Rama appears to identify Jabali's views as Buddhist, Jabali's arguments reflect the Charvaka school of thought. William Theodore de Bary calls Jabali's speech a parody of Buddhist scepticism and antinomianism.
