= Narghota =

Coordinates: 32.206°N 76.303°E

Narghota is a small village under Kajlot panchayat situated 3 kilometres (1.9 mi) southwest of Dharamshala in Himachal Pradesh, India.

The village is home for handful of families (mostly Rajputs) who take pride in their tradition of serving in defense services. The village is virtually rebuilt after it was destroyed, without any fatalities, in a 1986 earthquake.

== Points of attraction ==
- Surrounding Tea Gardens
- Kunal Pathri Temple
