= Rani Padmavati =

Rani Padmavati may refer to:

- Padmavati (wife of Ashoka), chief concubine of Emperor Ashoka
- Rani Padmini, also known as Padmavati, a legendary queen of Chittor, celebrated in the Padmavat
