= Padmavati (wife of Ashoka) =

Mauryan queen and wife of Ashoka

- Queen of the Maurya Empire
- Reign: c. 268 BCE – c. 232 BCE
- Born: c. 302 BCE
- Died: After 232 BCE
- Spouse: Ashoka (m. 268 BCE)
- Issue: Kunala
- Dynasty: Maurya
- Religion: Buddhism

Padmavati was a queen of the Maurya Empire and a wife of Emperor Ashoka. She was the mother of his son Kunala, also known as Dharmavivardhana. She is mentioned in Buddhist literature of the Mauryan royal family.

== Life ==
According to the Divyavadana, Padmavati was the mother of Dharmavivardhana, who later became known as Kunala. The text also describes events surrounding Kunala's life and his relationship with the Mauryan royal family.

== Family ==
=== Kunala ===
Padmavati's son Kunala was also known as Dharmavivardhana. According to the Divyavadana, this was the name given to him at birth. The name Kunala was associated with his beautiful eyes, which were compared to those of a bird.

Kunala is the subject of a Buddhist legend concerning his blinding. According to the story, his stepmother, Queen Tishyarakshita, plotted against him after he rejected her advances. The story is preserved in Buddhist literature and is not independently confirmed by contemporary evidence.

=== Samprati ===
Padmavati is traditionally regarded as the grandmother of Samprati, a later Mauryan ruler. Samprati is particularly remembered in Jain traditions for his support of Jainism.

== See also ==
- Ashoka
- Maurya Empire
- Kunala
- Samprati
- Karuvaki
- Tishyarakshita
