= Mahadeva (Buddhism) =

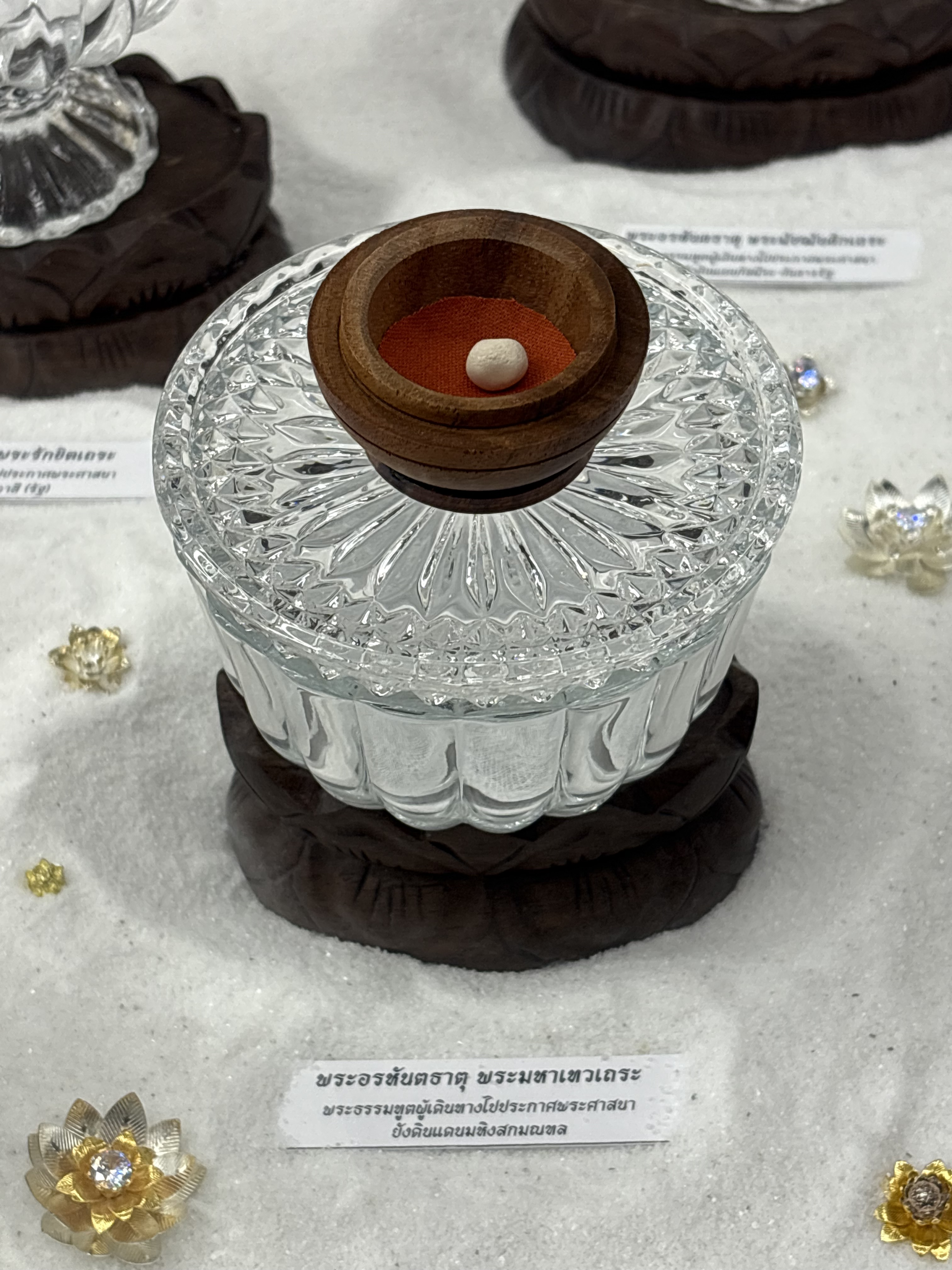
Relics of Mahadeva, collection of Wat Pathum Wanaram Temple, Bangkok

Mahādeva (Sanskrit: महादेव; Chinese: 大天; pinyin: Dàtiān) is a controversial figure who appears in various roles in the histories of the early Buddhist schools.

== Various roles and existence ==
=== As the cause of the first schism ===
Various sources present Mahādeva as playing different roles, and the historical existence of such a person is often criticized. In sources deriving from the Sthaviravāda branch, he is taken to be the founder of the Mahāsāṃghikas, and the figure who caused the split between the two branches. According to this account, some 35 years after the Second Buddhist Council at Vaishali, there was another meeting over five points allegedly held by a figure named Mahādeva. These five points were essentially regarding doctrines of the fallibility and imperfection of arhats, which were opposed by some. In this account, the majority (Mahāsaṃgha) sided with Mahādeva, and the minority (Sthaviras) were opposed to it, thus causing a split in the Saṃgha.

However, scholars have generally agreed that the matter of dispute was a matter of vinaya instead. In the earliest account, the council was convened at Pāṭaliputra over matters of vinaya, and it is explained that the schism resulted from the majority (Mahāsaṃgha) refusing to accept the addition of rules to the Vinaya by the minority (Sthaviras). This account is bolstered by the vinaya texts themselves, as vinayas associated with the Sthaviras do contain more rules than those of the Mahāsāṃghika Vinaya. For example, the Mahāsāṃghika Prātimokṣa has 67 rules in the śaikṣa-dharma section, while the Theravāda version has 75 rules. Modern scholarship is generally in agreement that the Mahāsāṃghika Vinaya is the oldest. Joseph Walser concludes that this Mahādeva was most likely a literary figure.

=== As founder of the Caitika schools ===
The Samayabhedoparacanacakra records that Mahādeva was a completely different figure who was the founder of the Caitika sect over 100 years later. A number of scholars have concluded that an association of "Mahādeva" with the first schism was a later sectarian interpolation. Jan Nattier and Charles Prebish state that Mahādeva was the later founder of the Caitikas, stating:

Mahādeva has nothing to do with the primary schism between the Mahāsāṃghikas and Sthaviras, emerging in a historical period considerably later than previously supposed, and taking his place in the sectarian movement by instigating an internal schism within the already existing Mahāsāṃghika school.

== Legends about evil deeds ==
Numerous legends about Mahādeva exist, all of which refer to the figure who supposedly caused the first schism in the Buddhist saṃgha.

He was ordained at Kukkutarama in Pataliputra, before taking the head of the sangha. The story of his transformation from a sinner of the worst kind to a learned monk was among the collection of tales relating to Buddhism, taken back to China by Xuanzang. The story of his transformation is titled as "The sins of Mahadeva". His father was a wealthy and ambitious trader who had married at a very young age. He often went away to foreign lands to trade and amass wealth. It is said that Mahadeva had a very pleasant and radiant face. But he was unfortunate not to get the love of his father during his childhood. In his teens he committed his first sin, by indulging in an incestuous relationship with his mother. Mahadeva was frightened of his father coming to know about this relationship and hence murdered him, thereby committing his second cardinal sin. He then, in order to escape from the guilt ran away with his mother to a distant land and started life fresh. But there, one day he ran into an old neighbour who was on a tour to the land that Mahadeva had made his new home. The man was treated as a guest and was given refuge for a few days in Mahadeva's house. After a few days the guest started asking questions about Mahadeva's sudden disappearance from his native land. Mahadeva felt threatened and poisoned the guest, thereby committing his third cardinal sin. Some years later he began to doubt his mother, for whom he had committed all the murders. When he found that his mother was involved in a relationship with another man, Mahadeva felt emotionally wrecked and out of his frustration he murdered his mother thereby committing the fourth cardinal sin of his life. After this incident Mahadeva found his life meaningless and teetered on the brink of insanity. He, in fact was about to take his own life when he came to know that a Buddhist monk with a panacea for sinners had arrived in the town. Mahadeva decided to give his wretched life one more chance and approached the monk who was camping near Pataliputra. It was at this place that Mahadeva was ordained as member of the Buddhist sangha.
