= Greek invasion of India =

Greek invasion of India may refer to:

- The Greek invasion of India as part of the Indian campaign of Alexander the Great
- The Greek invasion of India as part of the Shunga–Greek War

== See also ==
- Greek invasion (disambiguation)
