= Ashok Kumar (film) =

- Theatrical release poster
- Directed by: Raja Chandrasekhar
- Written by: Ilangovan
- Starring: M. K. Thiyagaraja Bhagavathar; Chittoor V. Nagayya; P. Kannamba
- Cinematography: Jiten Banerjee
- Edited by: T. R. Raghunath
- Music by: Alathur V. Subramaniyam
- Production company: Murugan Talkies
- Release date: 17 September 1941
- Running time: 211 minutes
- Country: India
- Language: Tamil

Ashok Kumar is a 1941 Indian Tamil-language historical drama film directed by Raja Chandrasekhar. Based on a legend involving the Mauryan emperor Ashoka The Great, his son Kunala and Ashoka's second wife Thishyarakshai, it stars M. K. Thyagaraja Bhagavathar, Chittoor V. Nagayya and P. Kannamba. The film was released on 17 September 1941.

== Plot ==
The Mauryan emperor Ashoka's son Kunalan is courted by Ashoka's second wife Tishyarakshai. When he rejects her advances, she falsely accuses him of trying to seduce her. He is thrown into prison and blinded. The story, however, comes to a happy end with Kunalan's eyesight being miraculously restored by Gautama Buddha and his name being cleared.

== Cast ==
Male cast

- M. K. Thyagaraja Bhagavathar as Kunalan
- Chittoor V. Nagayya as Samrat Ashokar
- Rangasami Iyengar as Radhaguptar
- N. S. Krishnan as Doctor Theraiyan
- K. Mahadeva Iyer as Upaguptar
- M. G. Ramchandran as Mahendran
- K. V. Venkatrama Iyer as Kanjuki
- Murali as Kokkaiyan
- R. Ranjan as Gautama Buddha (uncredited)

Female cast

- P. Kannamba as Tishyarakshai
- T. V. Kumuthini as Kanchanamala
- T. A. Mathuram as Pramila

== Production ==
Ashok Kumar is based on a legend involving the Mauryan emperor Ashoka, his son Kunalan and Ashoka's younger queen Thishyarakshai. It was the first Tamil film based on the legend, which was previously filmed in Hindi as Veer Kunal (1925). Telugu actress P. Kannamba played the role of Thishyarakshai. This was her second Tamil film and since she did not know the language, she was provided with a script in which Tamil words had been transliterated into Telugu. Ashok Kumar marked the debut of Ranjan (credited as R. Ramani), who portrayed Gautama Buddha. The song and dance sequence, "Unnai Kandu Mayangaatha" was shot in a single night at Newtone Studio.

== Soundtrack ==
The songs were composed by Alathur V. Subramanyam and the lyrics were written by Papanasam Sivan. Playback singers are Rama Rao and Mani of the Renuka Orchestra.

No.	Title	Lyrics	Singer(s)	Length
1.	"Unnai Kandu"	Papanasam Sivan	M. K. Thyagaraja Bhagavathar	2:51
2.	"Dhyaname Enadu"	Papanasam Sivan	M. K. Thyagaraja Bhagavathar	3:06
3.	"Manamae Nee"	Papanasam Sivan	M. K. Thyagaraja Bhagavathar	3:19
4.	"Sathvaguna Bothan"	Papanasam Sivan	M. K. Thyagaraja Bhagavathar	3:14
5.	"Bhoomiyil Maanida Jenmam"	Papanasam Sivan	M. K. Thyagaraja Bhagavathar	2:46
Total length:				15:16

=== Music credits ===
Sharma Brothers Orchestra

- R. N. Thambi – Veena
- V. Govindasami – Fiddle
- N. L. Ramalingam – Harmonium
- R. V. Parikshithu – Mridangam

== Release and reception ==
Ashok Kumar was released on 17 September 1941. Kay Yess Enn of The Indian Express praised the film for Kannamba's performance.

== In other media ==
- Portions of "Bhoomiyil Maanida" were used in "Theepidikka", a song in Arinthum Ariyamalum (2005).
- This song was also partly used as background music to a scene where tea estate workers march from the parade ground to the hills to pluck tea leaves, in the film Elephant Walk (1955) that was shot in Sri Lanka.

== Bibliography ==
- Rajadhyaksha, Ashish; Willemen, Paul (1998) [1994]. Encyclopaedia of Indian Cinema (PDF). British Film Institute and Oxford University Press. ISBN 0-19-563579-5.
