= Dasharatha Maurya =

Mauryan emperor from 232 to 224 BCE

- Devanampriya
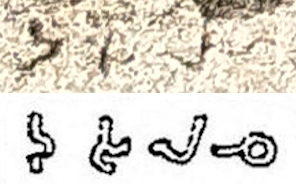
- Name of Dasaratha (𑀤𑀲𑀭𑀣) Maurya in the Gopika cave door inscription, c. 232 – c. 224 BCE

Maurya Emperor
- Reign: c. 232 – c. 224 BCE
- Predecessor: Ashoka
- Successor: Samprati
- Co-emperor: Samprati (Western Province)
- Born: c. 252 BCE; Pataliputra, Maurya Empire (Present day Bihar, India)
- Died: c. 224 BCE (Aged 28); Pataliputra, Maurya Empire (Present-day Bihar, India)
- Dynasty: Maurya
- Religion: Buddhism

Dasharatha Maurya (IAST: Daśaratha) was the 4th Mauryan emperor from 232 to 224 BCE. He was a grandson of Ashoka the Great and is commonly held to have succeeded him as the Emperor of Magadha. Dasharatha presided over a declining imperium and several territories of the empire broke away from central rule during his reign. He had continued the religious and social policies of Ashoka. Dasharatha was the last Mauryan emperor to have issued imperial inscriptions—thus the last Mauryan emperor to be known from epigraphical sources.

Dasharatha died in 224 BCE and was succeeded by his cousin Samprati.

== Background ==
Dasharatha was a grandson of the Mauryan emperor Ashoka. He is commonly held to have succeeded his grandfather as Emperor of Magadha although some sources including the Vayu Purana have given different names and numbers of Maurya Emperors after Ashoka. Of the grandsons of Ashoka, the two most frequently mentioned are Samprati and Dasharatha. The latter is described in the Vishnu Purana as the son and imperial successor of Suyashas (a son of Ashoka). It has been suggested that Suyash was an alternative name of Ashoka's son and presumptive heir Kunala.

== Administration ==
Historians Vincent Smith and Romila Thapar advanced the popular theory of a division of the Mauryan Empire amongst Kunala and Dasharatha after the death of Ashoka. In some of the sources the division is recorded as having been between Samprati and Dasharatha, the latter holding the eastern parts with the capital at Pataliputra and the former the western imperium with the capital at Ujjain. However, Smith also wrote that "there is no clear evidence to support [the] hypothesis."

The Vayu and Brahmanda Puranas mention three Mauryan rulers—Bandhupalita, Indrapalita and Dasona—whose identification is rather difficult. It has been suggested that they may have been members of a branch line of the Maurya dynasty whom Dasharatha had appointed as viceroys for the convenience of administration.

The political unity of the Mauryan Empire did not long survive Ashoka's death. One of Dasharatha's uncles, Jalauka, set up an independent kingdom in Kashmir. According to Taranatha, another Mauryan prince, Virasena declared himself king in Gandhara. Vidarbha also seceded. Evidence from Greek sources confirm the loss of the north-western provinces which was then ruled by the Mauryan ruler Sophagasenus (Subhagasena, probably a successor of Virasena). There is also much modern speculation about a possible east–west division of the empire involving Dasharatha and another Mauryan ruler. Epigraphic evidence indicates that Dasharatha retained imperial power in Magadha.

Various dynasties of the south including the Satavahana had been vassals of the Mauryan Empire. These kingdoms are mentioned in Ashoka's edicts (256 BCE) and were considered part of the outer circle of the imperium—subject to the rule of the Mauryan Emperor, although doubtless enjoying a considerable degree of autonomy under their local rulers. The death of Ashoka began the decline of imperial power in the south. Dasharatha was able to maintain some command of the home provinces, but the distant governments, including areas in the south, broke away from imperial rule and reasserted their independence. The Mahameghavahana dynasty of Kalinga in central-eastern India also broke away from imperial rule after the death of Ashoka.

According to a Jain text, the provinces of Saurashtra, Maharashtra, Andhra and Mysore broke away from the empire shortly after Ashoka's death, but were reconquered by Dasharatha's successor, Samprati (who supposedly deployed soldiers disguised as Jain monks).

== Religion ==
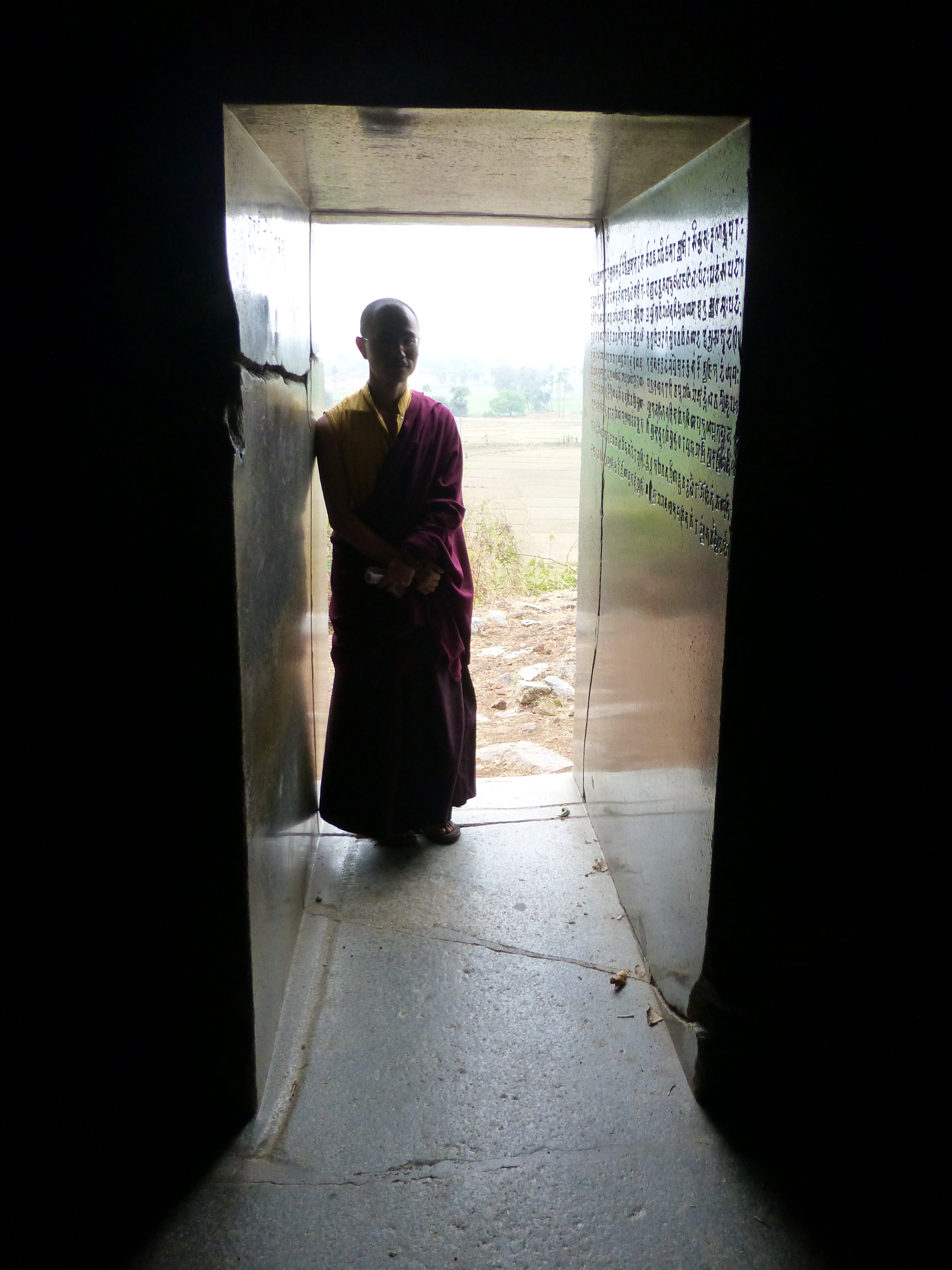
Entrance corridor of the Gopika Cave, with polished granite walls, built and dedicated by Dasharatha Maurya

Ashoka had displayed divine support in his inscriptions; although a Buddhist ruler, he was called Devanampriya, which means "Beloved of the Gods" in Pali. The title of Devanampiya and religious adherence of the Mauryan ruler to Buddhism was continued by Dasharatha.

Dasharatha is known to have dedicated three caves in the Nagarjuni Hills to the Ajivikas. Three inscriptions at the caves refer to him as "Devanampiya" and state that the caves were dedicated by him shortly after his accession.

=== Nagarjuni caves inscriptions by Dasaratha Maurya ===
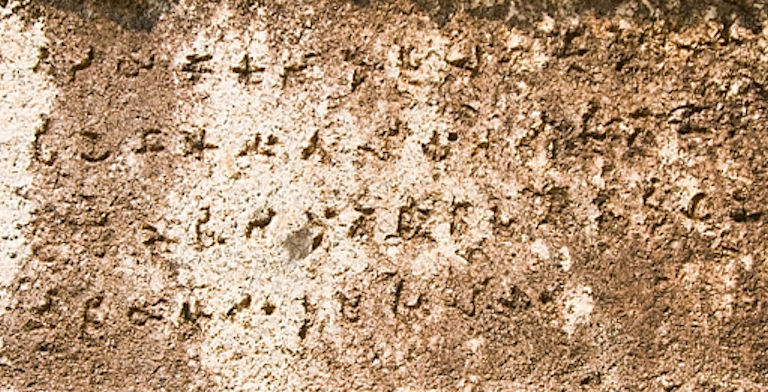
Dedicatory inscription of Dasaratha Maurya above the entrance of the Vadathika cave

Dasaratha Maurya, Ashoka's grandson and regnal successor, wrote dedicatory inscriptions in the three forming the Nagarjuni group (Gopika, Vadathi and Vapiya caves) of the Barabar Caves. It is generally considered that their construction dates from his reign.

The three caves were offered to the Ajivikas upon the accession to the throne of Dasaratha, confirming that these were still active around 230 BCE, and that Buddhism was not the exclusive religion of the Mauryas at that time.

The three caves are also characterized by an extremely advanced finish of the granite walls inside, which again confirms that the technique of "Mauryan polish" did not die out with the reign of Ashoka.

Inscriptions of Dasaratha (grandson of Ashoka)
English translation	Prakrit in Brahmi script (original text of the Nagarjuni Caves)
Inscription of Gopika cave: "The cave of Gopika, a refuge that will last as long as the sun and the moon, was dug by Devanampiya (beloved of the gods) Dasaratha at from his elevation to the throne, to make it a hermitage for the most pious Ajivikas". Inscription of Vapiyaka Cave: "Vadathi Cave, a refuge that will last as long as the sun and the moon, was dug by Devanampiya (beloved of the gods) Dasaratha during his elevation to the throne, to make it a hermitage for the most pious Ajivikas ". Inscription of Vadathika Cave: "Vadathi Cave, a refuge that will last as long as the sun and the moon, was dug by Devanampiya (beloved of the gods) Dasaratha during his elevation to the throne, to make it a hermitage for the most pious Ajivikas ".	

== Succession ==
Samprati, who succeeded Dasharatha, was according to the Hindu Puranas, the latter's son and according to the Buddhist and Jain sources, Kunala's son (making him possibly a brother of Dasharatha). The familial relationship between the two is thus not clear although evidently they were closely related members of the imperial family.

== See also ==
- Mauryan art
- Devavarman (Maurya)
- Samprati

== Notes ==
Dasharatha Maurya Maurya Dynasty
Preceded by Ashoka	Maurya Emperor; 232–224 BCE	Succeeded by Samprati
