= China Report =

- Discipline: Chinese studies
- Language: English
- Edited by: Sreemati Chakrabarti

Publication details
- History: 1964
- Publisher: Sage Publications India Pvt. Ltd.
- Frequency: Quarterly
- Impact factor: 0.5

Standard abbreviations
- ISO 4: China Rep.

Indexing
- ISSN: 0009-4455 (print); 0973-063X (web)

Links
- Journal homepage; Online access; Online archive

The China Report is a refereed academic journal published by SAGE Publications, India four times a year in association with the Institute of Chinese Studies. It is edited by Sreemati Chakrabarti.

The journal is a member of the Committee on Publication Ethics (COPE).

== Abstracting and indexing ==
China Report is abstracted and indexed in:

- Clarivate Analytics: Emerging Sources Citation Index (ESCI)
- DeepDyve
- Dutch-KB
- EBSCO
- Indian Citation Index (ICI)
- J-Gate
- OCLC
- Ohio
- Portico
- Pro-Quest-RSP
- ProQuest-Illustrata
- ProQuest: International Bibliography of the Social Sciences (IBSS)
- SCOPUS
- UGC-CARE (GROUP II)
