= Asandhimitra =

Queen and chief consort of the Mauryan emperor Ashoka

- Agramahisi

Empress Consort of Mauryan Empire
- Reign: c. 268 BC – c. 240 BCE
- Predecessor: Mother of Ashoka
- Successor: Tishyaraksha
- Born: c. 304 BCE; Magadha, Maurya Empire (present day Bihar, India)
- Died: c. 240 BC (aged 64-65); Pataliputra, Maurya Empire (present day Bihar, India)
- Spouse: Ashoka (m. 270 BCE)
- Dynasty: Maurya
- Religion: Buddhism

Asandhimitra (304 BCE – 240 BCE) was an empress and 1st chief consort of the Mauryan emperor Ashoka. She was Ashoka's second wife and first empress consort

Given the title "agramahisi", or "Chief Empress", Asandhimitra was likely from a royal family. She did not have any children. After her death, Tishyarakshita became the first chief empress of Ashoka.

== Life ==
According to Maha Bodhi Society, she was married to Ashoka during c. 270-240 BC. She was a trusted, faithful, and favourite wife of Ashoka. She is often referred to as his "beloved" or his "dear" consort and is said to have been a trusted adviser of the emperor. At her death in c. 240 BC, Ashoka was deeply grieved.

== Karmic legends ==
The Mahavamsa tells a legend of how she became empress, stating that she became Ashoka's empress because in a previous life, she had given directions to a pratyekabuddha who was looking for a honey merchant. The story says that after the merchant filled his bowl completely with honey, the pratyekabuddha made a vow to become the lord of Jambudvipa. After hearing this, she herself wished they would be reborn as King and Queen, leading them to be reborn as Ashoka and Asandhimitra.

In the Extended Mahavamsa, a story is additionally told that in a separate past life, Asandhimitra gave a pratyekabuddha a piece of cloth, which is thought to have given her the status of Queen, karmically independent of Asoka.

In the Dasavatthuppakarana, it combines both stories into one, telling the story of the pratyekabuddha and the honey merchant and adding that Asandhimitra's past self gifted the same pratyekabuddha with a piece of cloth.
