= Kukkutarama =

Buddhist monastery in Pataliputra, India

Kukkutarama was a Buddhist monastery in Pataliputra in eastern India, which is famous as the location of various "Discourses at the Kukkutarama Monastery", and for the eponymous "Kukkutarama sutra". Kukkutarama was also a Buddhist in Kosambi.

Charles Allen writes that Ashoka built this Monastery and that the Amalaka stupa outside the monastery was built to commemorate his death. Xuanzang and Faxian mentioned the monastery as well.

According to an Ashokavadana legend, the Shunga king Pushyamitra tried to destroy the monastery, but it was saved by a miracle.

Mahadeva is said to have received his ordination at Kukkutarama (Pataliputta), before becoming the head of the sangha.
