= Jayantanuja Bandyopadhyaya =

Bengali diplomat and international relations scholar

- Born: 3 February 1933; Bajrajogini Village, Bikrampur, Munshiganj District Bangladesh
- Died: 5 October 2009 (aged 76)
- Education: Jadavpur University
- Scientific career
- Fields: International Relations
- Workplaces: Indian Foreign Service; Ministry of External Affairs (India); Columbia University; American University

Notes
- Jayantanuja Bandyopadhyaya on Flickr

Jayantanuja Bandyopadhyaya (1933 — 5 October 2009) was a former Bengali diplomat and scholar of International relations. He is best known for his classic study The Making of Indian Foreign Policy (1970), which is considered a classic in Indian scholarship in International Relations.

== Career ==
Before becoming an academic, Bandypadhyaya had been a diplomat, entering the Indian Foreign Service in 1955 and reaching the level of Undersecretary in the Ministry of External Affairs, before resigning in 1960 to take up a university post in Kolkata. He remained at Jadavpur University until his retirement in 1993, advancing to the rank of professor, among other positions.

== The Making of Indian Foreign Policy ==
Bandyopadhyaya's classic study is still considered an indispensable guide to the foreign policy-making process in New Delhi. The book's strength comes from an unusual combination of scholarly rigor and inside knowledge. Bandyopadhyaya develops a distinctive contribution to IR theory through a “hybrid” approach derived from Gandhi and Mao, on the one hand, and behavioralist systems theories, on the other. The study outlines the evolution of his thinking and the connections with his broader concerns with postcolonial nation-building.

== Influence ==
Above all, Bandypadhyaya played a leading part in advancing Jadavpur University's School of International Relations and Strategic Studies, one of the few centers of political influence outside the national capital. The Making of Indian Foreign Policy is one of over a dozen books that Bandyopadhyaya has published on various topics. The majority of his works address the theory and practice of social and economic development in postcolonial states, particularly in China and India. They include studies of Indian nationalism and international communism (1966), and Gandhi's social and political thought (1969).

== Publications ==
- Aspects of Soviet economy. Samajvadi Sahitya Parishad, 1954. ASIN B0007JZHEI
- The theory and practice of parliamentary opposition. Indian National Congress, 1967. ASIN B0007K7YTS
- The Congress and democratic socialism. All India Congress Committee, 1968. ASIN B0007KCU2E
- Social and Political Thought of Gandhi. Allied Publishers, 1969. ASIN B003VCCJ30
- The Making of India's Foreign Policy: determinants, institutions, processes, and personalities. Allied Publishers, 1970. ASIN B000U3CJ6K
- Mao Tse-tung and Gandhi: Perspectives on Social Transformation. Allied Publishers, 1973. ASIN B001TO3WG0
- Triumphs and Tragedies of Maoism in China. In: China Report, March 1973, vol. 9, no. 2, p. 20–30. doi:10.1177/000944557300900203
- International Relations as a Communication System. In: International Studies, April 1975, vol. 14, no. 2, 251–275. doi:10.1177/002088177501400203
- National Character and International Relations. In: International Studies, October 1976, vol. 15 no. 4, p. 531–555. doi:10.1177/002088177601500404
- Dynamics of India's Strategic Environment. In: International Studies, July 1978, vol. 17, no. 3-4 399–411. doi:10.1177/002088177801700303
- Climate as an Obstacle to Development in the Tropics. In: International Social Science Journal, 1978, vol. 30, issue 2, p. 339–352.
- North over south: A non-western perspective of international relations. Harvester Press, 1982. ISBN 978-0-7108-0344-3 / South Asia Books, 1982. ISBN 978-0-8364-0894-2

Book review by John C. Campbell.

- Climate and World Order: An Inquiry into the Natural Cause of Underdevelopment. Atlantic Highlands, NJ: Humanities Press, 1983. ISBN 978-0-391-02893-7
- The making of India's foreign policy: Determinants, institutions, processes, and personalities. Asia Book Corporation of America, 1984. ASIN B0007BPHNM
- The Poverty of Nations: A Global Perspective of Mass Poverty in the Third World. South Asia Books, 1988. ISBN 978-0-8364-2302-0
- Structure of Liberty: National and International: A general theory of liberty in a global perspective. Allied Publishers Private Limited, India, 1989. ISBN 978-81-7023-119-6
- Nationalism Unveiled. Allied Publishers Private Limited, 1991. ISBN 978-81-7023-266-7
- International relations and global equilibrium: Some mathematical models. K.P. Bagchi & Co (for the School of International Relations and Strategic Studies at Jadavpur University), 1992. ISBN 978-81-7074-118-3
- A General Theory of International Relations. South Asia Books, 1993. ISBN 978-81-7023-126-4
- Samajabijnanera drshtite Bhagabadgita. Bengali Edition. Elaida Pabalisarsa, 1994. ISBN 978-81-7023-159-2
- A theory of equality: Towards a radical post-Marxian ideology. Allied, 1995. ISBN 978-81-7023-427-2
- Asymmetry, Equilibrium, and World Peace: Balance of Power or World Government?. In: International Studies, October 1999, vol. 36, no. 4, p. 309–337. doi:10.1177/0020881799036004001
- International Regimes and World Peace: A Case Study of NPT and CTBT. In: International Studies, October 2000, vol. 37, no. 4, p. 303–338. doi:10.1177/0020881700037004002
- Ganatantra, dharma o rajaniti. Bengali Edition. Myanaskripta Indiya, 2001. ISBN 978-81-901127-4-1
- Class struggle and caste oppression: integral strategy of the left. In: The Marxist, vol. 18, no. 03–04, July–December 2002.
- Class and Religion in Ancient India. Anthem Press India, 2008. ISBN 978-1-84331-727-2
