= Kunala =

Crown Prince of Magadha
- Predecessor: Ashoka
- Successor: Samprati
- Born: 263 BC
- Spouse: Kanchanamala
- Issue: Samprati
- Dynasty: Maurya
- Father: Ashoka
- Mother: Queen Padmavati

Kunala (IAST: Kuṇāla) (263 BC – ?) was the Crown Prince and second son of 3rd Mauryan Emperor Ashoka and Padmavati and the presumptive heir to Ashoka, thus the heir to the Mauryan Empire which once ruled almost all of the Indian subcontinent. After the departure of Mahendra, Ashoka's eldest son, he was supposed to be the heir to the empire, but was blinded by his step-mother, Tishyaraksha, at a young age in jealousy. While he was not able to take the throne, his son, Samprati, became his heir.

Kunala also served as the Viceroy of Taxila during the reign of his father, having been appointed to the position in 235 BCE.

== Significance of name ==
Kunal also means "bird with beautiful eyes", "someone who sees beauty in everything" or "one with beautiful eyes".

== Early life ==
At the age of eight, Ashoka sent his son to Ujjain, to be brought up and carry out his princely education, to become the heir to the throne of the Mauryan Empire.

== Blinding ==
According to some accounts, when Kunala was eight years old, Emperor Ashoka wrote a letter in Prakrit to his tutors with the instruction adheetaam, meaning "he (Kunala) must study", indicating that the prince should begin his education. One of Ashoka's wives Tishyarakshita, who wished to secure the succession for her own son, allegedly altered the letter by adding a dot over the letter 'a', changing the word to andheetaam, meaning "he (Kunala) must be blinded". Without reviewing the altered text, the emperor sealed and sent the letter. The official in Ujjayini, shocked by the command, hesitated to read it aloud, prompting Kunala to read it himself. Interpreting the order as binding, Kunala is said to have blinded himself to obey his father.

Another tradition states that Kunala had been sent to Taxila to quell a rebellion, which he did without bloodshed, but was later blinded through the treachery of Ashoka's wife Tishyaraksha.

According to Xuanzang, Ashoka blinded the queen who plotted against Kunal, and after ordering her execution, he started criticizing his ministers and court officials. Several were removed from office, exiled, demoted, or put to death, while numerous influential and affluent families were forcibly relocated to the desert region beyond the north-east of Himalayas. According to Charles Allen, Kunal seemed to be heading a powerful Buddhist faction and the new queen headed a non-Buddhist faction, which was ultimately crushed.

Some later narratives claim that Kunala went to Ashoka to contest the letter, leading the emperor to discover the alteration and order the queen's execution; however, these accounts are considered legendary and lack historical verification.

== Attempts to claim throne ==
Years later Kunala came to Ashoka's court dressed as a minstrel accompanied by his favourite wife Kanchanmala. When he greatly pleased the emperor by his music, the emperor wanted to reward him. At this, the minstrel revealed himself as prince Kunala and demanded his inheritance. Ashoka sadly objected that being blind, Kunala never could ascend the throne. Thereupon the latter said that he claimed the empire not for himself but for his son. "When," cried the emperor, "has a son been born to you?" "Samprati" (meaning "Just now") was the answer. Samprati accordingly was the name given to Kunala's son, and though a baby, he was appointed Ashoka's successor. However, when Ashoka died, Samprati was too young to rule. Therefore, Ashoka was succeeded by another, older grandson, Dasharatha. After the demise of Dasharatha, Samprati did indeed become Emperor.

It is said that Prince Kunala established a kingdom in the Mithila region on the Indo-Nepal Border. It might be the same place where the present village, Kunauli (earlier known as Kunal Gram) at the bank of Kosi river on the Indo-Nepal Border is situated. There are some historical and archaeological evidences to support this claim.

== Portrayal in popular media ==
A semi-fictionalized portrayal of Kunal's life was produced as a motion picture under the title Veer Kunal (1941). Ashok Kumar, a Tamil film was produced in 1941 based on the life of Kunal.

== See also ==
- History of India
- Dhritarashtra
- Bindusara
