= Samprati =

Mauryan Emperor from 224 to 215 BCE

Samprati संप्रति
- Chakravartin; Nripa
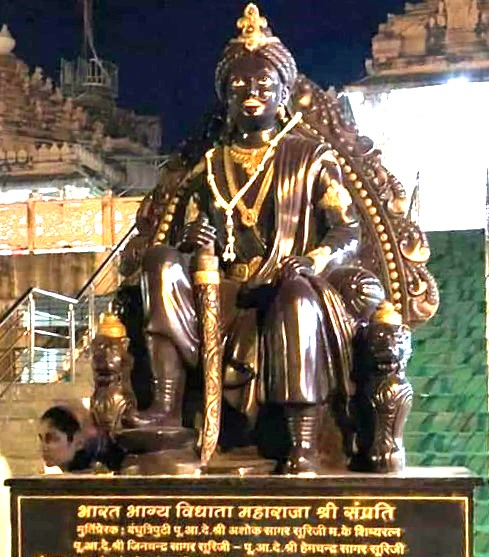

5th Maurya Emperor
- Reign: c. 224 – c. 215 BCE
- Coronation: 224 BCE
- Predecessor: Dasharatha Maurya
- Successor: Shalishuka Maurya

Crown Prince of Magadha
- Predecessor: Kunala
- Successor: Unknown
- Born: Unknown; Pataliputra, Maurya Empire (Present day Bihar, India)
- Died: c. 215 BCE; Pataliputra, Maurya Empire (Present day Bihar, India)
- Issue: Shalishuka Maurya
- Dynasty: Maurya
- Father: Kunala
- Mother: Kanchanamala
- Religion: Jainism

Samprati (r. 224 – 215 BCE) was the fifth emperor of the Maurya Empire. He was the grandson of the third Mauryan emperor, Ashoka, and the son of Kunala. He succeeded his cousin, Dasharatha Maurya. According to Jain tradition, he built 150,000 Jain derasars and made 15 million Jain idols. He is also believed to have taken an oath to dig the foundation of a new Jinalaya every day, and would not take his navakrashi (breakfast) until it was completed.

== Claim to throne ==
Samprati was the grandson of emperor Ashoka and son of Kunala. Kunala was born to Ashoka's third wife, Padmavati (who was Jain), but was blinded in a conspiracy to remove his claim to the throne. Thus, Kunala was replaced by Dasharatha as the heir to the throne and lived in Ujjain with his "Dhai Maa" (wet nurse). Samprati was raised there. Years after being denied the throne, Kunala and Samprati approached Ashoka's court in an attempt to claim the throne. Ashoka could not grant his blind son's request but promised Samprati would be heir apparent to Dasharatha. After Dasharatha's death, Samprati ascended to the throne of the Maurya Empire.

== Reign ==
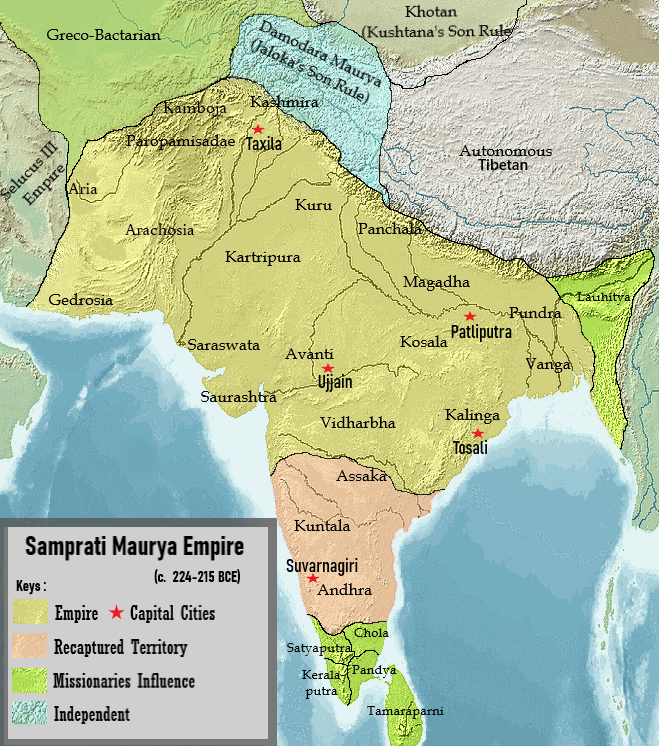
Samprati Maurya Empire

The Jaina text Pariśiṣṭaparvan mentions Samprati ruled both from Pataliputra and Ujjain. According to a Jain text, the provinces of Saurashtra, Maharashtra, Andhra and Mysore broke away from the empire shortly after Ashoka's death (i.e., during Dasharatha's reign), but were reconquered by Samprati, who later deployed soldiers disguised as Jain monks. According to Charles Allen, after Ashoka’s death, a succession struggle ensued. Dasharatha briefly ruled but was unpopular due to his support to Ajivikas. The Buddhist-backed heir, Samprati, later turned Jain, was ousted from Pataliputra by his cousin or nephew Shalishuka, and forced to set up a new capital in Ujjain.

== Samprati and Jainism ==
Samprati is regarded for his patronage and efforts to spread Jainism in east India. While in one source, he is described as nominally a Jain from birth (Sthaviravali 9.53), most accounts emphasize his conversion at the hands of the Jain monk Suhastisuri, the eighth leader of the congregation established by Mahavira. After his conversion he was credited with actively spreading Jainism to many parts of India and beyond, both by making it possible for monks to travel to barbarian lands and by building and renovating thousands of temples and establishing millions of idols. He was a disciple of Suhastisuri.

Kalpa-sutra-bhashya mentions Samprati making regions of Andhra, Dravida, Maharashtra and Coorg safe for Jain monks. He sent Jain missionaries to other countries for propagation of Jainism and southern part of India. He is popularly known as the "Jain Ashoka".

== In literature ==
Around 1100 CE Devachandrasuri of the Purnatalla Gaccha told the story of Samprati in his commentary on the Textbook on Fundamental Purity (Mulashuddhi Prakarana), in a chapter on the virtues of building temples. A century later, Amradevasuri of the Brihad Gaccha included the story of Samprati in his commentary to the Treasury of Stories (Akhyana Manikosha). In 1204, Malayaprabhasuri, a disciple of Manatungasuri of the Purnima Gaccha, wrote an extensive Prakrit commentary on his teacher's Deeds of Jayanti (Jayanti Carita), in which he included the story of Samprati as an example of the virtue of compassion (Caudhari 1973: 201-2). There are also some anonymous and undated medieval texts devoted solely to the story of Samprati, such as the 461-verse Sanskrit Deeds of King Samprati (Samprati Nripa Charitra).

== See also ==
- Bindusara
- Kharvela

== Notes ==
=== Sources ===
- Sharma, Suresh K.; Sharma, Usha (2004), Cultural and Religious Heritage of India: Jainism, Mittal Publications, ISBN 978-81-7099-957-7
- Cort, John (2010) [1953], Framing the Jina: Narratives of Icons and Idols in Jain History, Oxford University Press, ISBN 978-0-19-538502-1
- Shah, Natubhai (2004) [First published in 1998], Jainism: The World of Conquerors, vol. I, Motilal Banarsidass, ISBN 81-208-1938-1
- Vyas, Dr. R. T., ed. (1995), Studies in Jaina Art and Iconography and Allied Subjects, The Director, Oriental Institute, on behalf of the Registrar, M.S. University of Baroda, Vadodara, ISBN 81-7017-316-7

Samprati Maurya Dynasty
| Preceded by Dasharatha Maurya | Maurya Emperor; 224–215 BCE | Succeeded by Shalishuka |
