= Tishyaraksha =

Mauryan queen consort of Emperor Ashoka

Tishyarakshita
- Queen Consort of the Maurya Empire
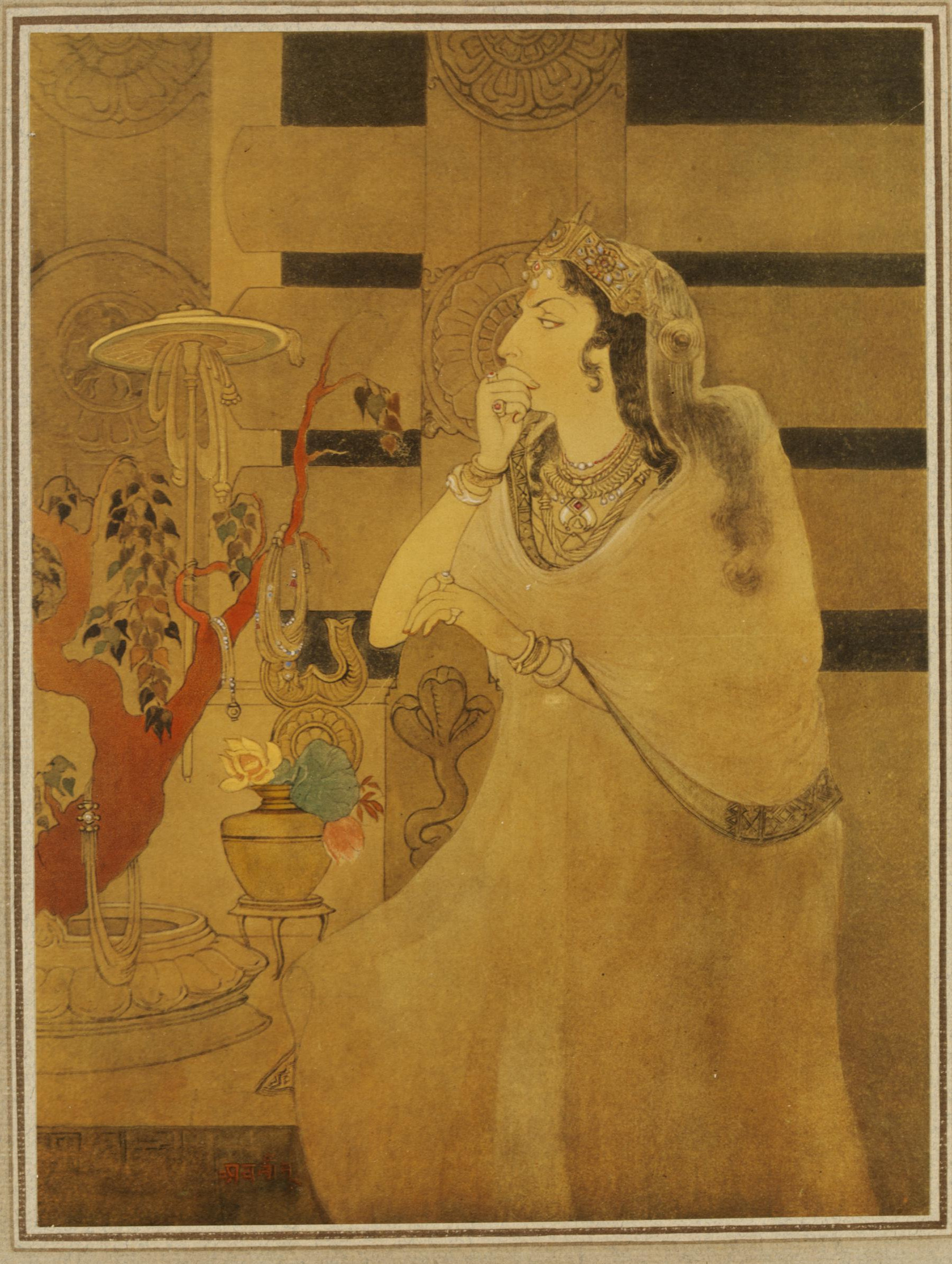
- Tishyarakshita orchestrates the Bodhi tree's destruction, depicted in a painting by Abanindranath Tagore, c. 1910
- Reign: c. 240–232 BCE (as Queen Consort)
- Predecessor: Asandhimitra
- Died: c. 232 BCE
- Spouse: Ashoka (m. 240–9 BCE)
- House: Maurya
- Religion: Hinduism

Tishyarakshita (Pali: Tissarakkhā, Sanskrit: Tiṣyarakṣitā) was the last queen consort of Emperor Ashoka of the Maurya Empire in the 3rd century BCE. She is primarily known from Buddhist chronicles for her treacherous role in the Mauryan court, including her alleged involvement in the blinding of Kunala, Ashoka's heir, and the destruction of the original Bodhi Tree.

== Sources and historicity ==
The primary sources that mention Tisyarakshita are Buddhist texts, including:

- The Divyāvadāna (3rd–4th century CE)
- The Aśokāvadāna (4-5th century CE)
- The Mahāvaṃsa (5th century CE)

Tisyarakshita is absent from Ashokan inscriptions, leading some historians to suggest that Buddhist chroniclers exaggerated her actions.

== Early life ==
Little is known about Tisyarakshita’s origins. She ascended as queen consort after the death of Ashoka's chief queen, Asandhimitra, around 240–9 BCE.

== Role as queen ==
Tisyarakshita reportedly gained political influence in the later years of Ashoka’s reign.

=== Blinding of Kunala ===
One of the most prominent accounts about Tisyarakshita is her alleged involvement in the blinding of Kunala, Ashoka’s son. The Aśokāvadāna states that she attempted to seduce Kunala, but when he rejected her, she issued an order that led to his blinding. The Divyāvadāna presents a similar version but highlights Kunala’s later forgiveness of Tisyarakshita. The Mahāvaṃsa suggests that the blinding was due to court intrigue, without explicitly blaming Tisyarakshita. Historians debate whether Kunala was actually blinded or whether the story is a later Buddhist embellishment.

=== Poisoning of the Bodhi Tree ===
The destruction of the Bodhi Tree at Bodh Gaya is another event attributed to Tisyarakshita. The Aśokāvadāna states that she hired a Matanga sorceress to curse the Bodhi Tree, mistakenly believing it to be a woman who had captured Ashoka’s devotion. After realizing her mistake, she tried to rectify her actions. The Divyāvadāna states that she was jealous of Ashoka’s devotion to the tree and ordered it poisoned. The Mahāvaṃsa confirms the poisoning but notes that the tree was later revived.

== Death ==
Tisyarakshita's fate is uncertain, most accounts do not mention her after Ashoka's final years.

== Bibliography ==
- Guruge, A.W.P. (1986). Emperor Asoka and Buddhism: Some Unresolved Discrepancies Between Buddhist Tradition and Asokan Inscriptions (PDF). University of Sri Jayewardenepura.
- Law, B.C. (1994). On the Chronicles of Ceylon. Asian Educational Services. ISBN 978-81-206-0907-5.
- Mendis, G.C. (1930). A Historical Criticism of the Mahavamsa. University of London.
- Mookerji, R. (1972). Asoka. Motilal Banarsidass. ISBN 978-81-208-0086-1.
- Olivelle, P. (2003). Constituting Communities: Theravada Buddhism and the Religious Cultures of South and Southeast Asia. SUNY Press. ISBN 978-0-7914-8705-1.
- Sarao, K.T.S. (2020). The History of Mahabodhi Temple at Bodh Gaya. Springer. doi:10.1007/978-981-15-8067-3_4.
- Strong, J.S. (1989). The Legend of King Aśoka: A Study and Translation of the Aśokāvadāna. Princeton University Press. ISBN 978-81-208-0616-0.
- Thapar, R. (2012). Aśoka and the Decline of the Mauryas. Oxford University Press. ISBN 978-0-19-908868-3.
