= Shunga–Greek War =

2nd century BCE wars in India

- Part of Greek campaigns in India
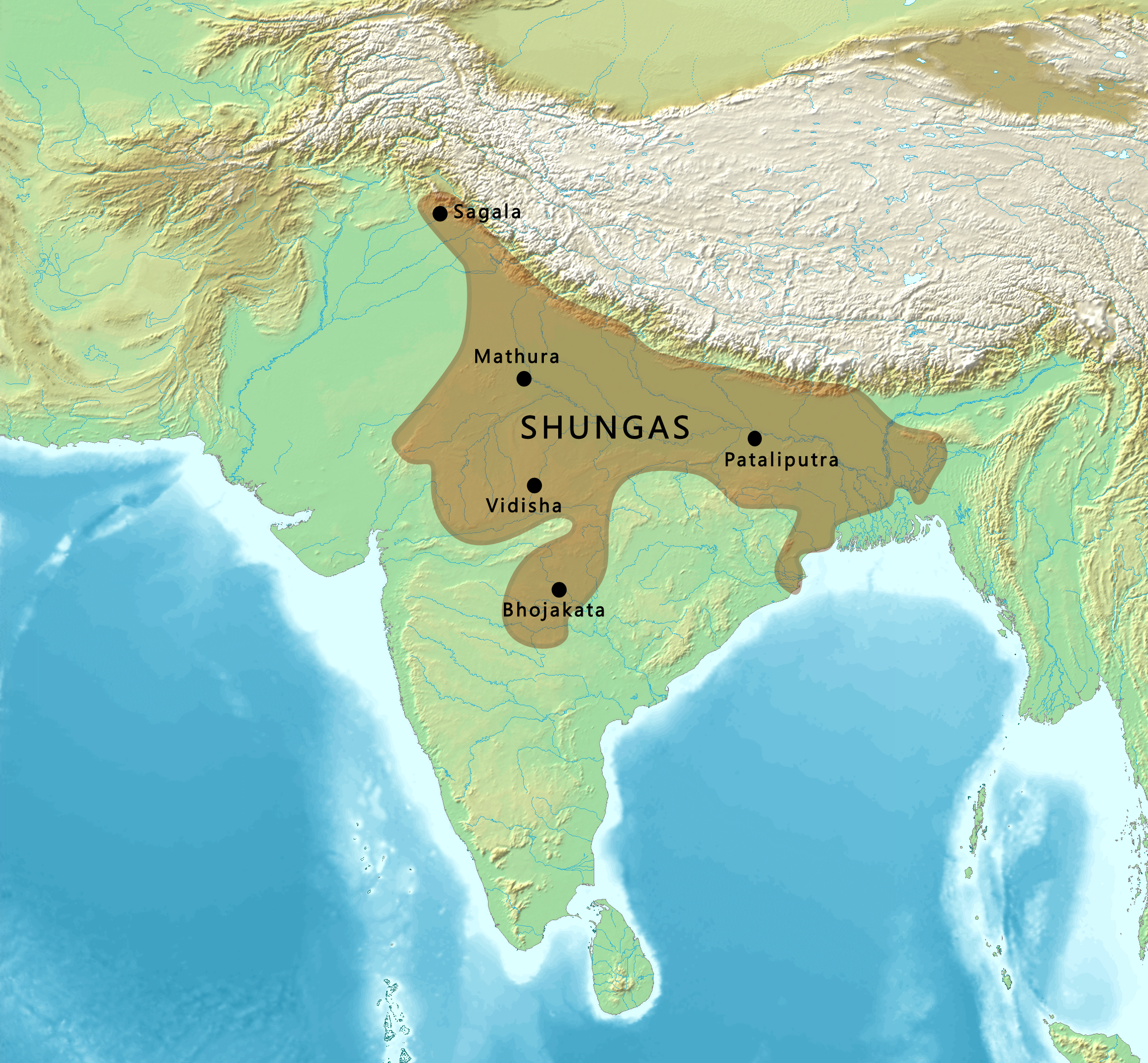
- Possible extent of Shunga Empire c. 150 BCE.
Date	180s–113 BCE
Location	Indian subcontinent
Result	Shunga victory

Belligerents
Greco-Bactrian Kingdom	Shunga Empire

Commanders and leaders
Demetrius I of Bactria; Menander I	Pushyamitra Shunga; Vasumitra Shunga

Strength
100,000	40,000

Casualties and losses
Unknown	Unknown

The Shunga–Greek War is believed to have comprised several conflicts between the Shunga Empire and the Greco-Bactrian Kingdom. The theory that such a war occurred is predominantly based on the Sanskrit play "Mālavikāgnimitram".

The Greek king Demetrius is regarded to have tried to invade the subcontinent after his win over the Kabul Valley. The Shungas were able to successfully resist the invasion and expel the Greeks out of Magadha.

== The Greek invasion ==
The first phase of the invasion starts with the Greek ruler Demetrius I's conquest of the Kabul Valley. He invaded the Indian subcontinent during the rule of the Mauryan Empire. He first invaded the province of Arachosia and was successful in taking control of the region. He then decided to raid the eastern territories of the subcontinent. He entered the Punjab region and again gained success. He may have had control over the Indian territories of Mathura and Patliputra for a short period of time.

"Those who came after Alexander went to the Ganges and Pataliputra" (Strabo, XV.698)

Hindu texts also suggest that the Greeks gained control on the territories of Saketa, Panchala, Mathura and Pataliputra (Yuga Purana).

However, Demetrius is said to have invaded only the northern territories of India. Later conquests had been done by Menander. The Buddhist text Milinda Panha describes Menander as:

King of the city of Euthymedia in India, Milinda by name, learned, eloquent, wise, and able; and a faithful observer, and that at the right time, of all the various acts of devotion and ceremony enjoined by his own sacred hymns concerning things past, present, and to come. Many were the arts and sciences he knew--holy tradition and secular law; the Sankhya, Yoga, Nyaya, and Vaisheshika systems of philosophy; arithmetic; music; medicine; the four Vedas, the Puranas, and the Itihasas; astronomy, magic, causation, and magic spells; the art of war; poetry; conveyancing in a word, the whole nineteen. As a disputant he was hard to equal, harder still to overcome; the acknowledged superior of all the founders of the various schools of thought. And as in wisdom so in strength of body, swiftness, and valour there was found none equal to Milinda in all India. He was rich too, mighty in wealth and prosperity, and the number of his armed hosts knew no end.

The first phase of the invasion ended here, followed by a civil war in Bactria. The Gargi-samhita states that the Yavanas who laid siege to Pushpapura did not remain in Madhyadesa for long due to "interregnum struggles, which escalated into "a cruel and dreadful war in their own kingdom." As a result, the Greeks seem to have lost control of Madhyadesa, as well as parts of the Punjab and the lower Sindhu valley, to Pushyamitra, at least temporarily. The King Demetrius returned back to Bactria leaving his governors to rule. Pushyamitra Shunga forced the Greeks out of Magadha.

During the reign of Menander I, the Bactrians (Indo-Greeks) advanced as far as Pataliputra, but they were defeated and driven back. Menander I personally fell under the influence of Indian culture and converted to Buddhism. He became a prominent figure in Buddhist tradition, known as King Milinda, and was revered almost like a saint in Buddhist legend.

Kalidasa’s Mālavikāgnimitram suggests that during Pushyamitra Shunga’s Rajasuya yajna, the horse led by his grandson Vasumitra Shunga was captured by the Yavanas. This triggered a fierce battle between Vasumitra’s army and the Yavanas, in which Vasumitra Shunga ultimately emerged victorious. (Note: "From Mālavikāgnimitram drama of Kālidāsa it appears that the horse let loose in the Pushyamitra’s Rājasūya-yajña under the leadership of his grandson Vasumitra was captured by Yavanas and thereafter ensued a fierce battle between the army of Vasumitra and the Yavanas in which Vasumitra was victorious. Then one Aśvamedha Yajña was performed in the fashion of the yajña performed by King Sagara after his horse was released by Anśumān.")

== Aftermath ==
The blending of Indian and Greek cultures eventually produced the unique Greco-Buddhist art of Gandhara, the region spanning parts of present-day Afghanistan and the northwestern frontier.

The Indo-Greeks and the Shungas seem to have reconciled and exchanged diplomatic missions around 113 BCE, as indicated by the Heliodorus pillar, which records the dispatch of a Greek ambassador named Heliodorus, from the court of the Indo-Greek king Antialcidas, to the court of the Shunga emperor Bhagabhadra at the site of Vidisha in central India. A pillar known as the Heliodorus column stands at Besnagar, near Sanchi in Central India. Dating back to the first century BC, it features a Sanskrit inscription that offers valuable insight into the Indianization of the Greeks who had settled on the Indian frontier. The pillar illustrates how these Greeks absorbed Indian culture. The inscription has been translated as follows:

This Garuda column of Vasudeva (Vishnu), the God of gods, was erected by Heliodorus, a worshipper of Vishnu, the son of Dion, and an inhabitant of Taxila, who came as Greek ambassador from the great King Antialcidas to King Kashiputra Bhagabhadra, the saviour, then reigning in the fourteenth year of his kingship.
Three immortal precepts, when practised well, lead to heaven—self-restraint, self-sacrifice (charity), conscientiousness.

== See also ==
- Demetrius I's invasion of India
