= Divyavadana =

Buddhist anthology

The Divyāvadāna or Divine narratives is a Sanskrit anthology of Buddhist avadana tales, many originating in Mūlasarvāstivādin vinaya texts. It may be dated to 2nd century CE. The stories themselves are therefore quite ancient and may be among the first Buddhist texts ever committed to writing, but this particular collection of them is not attested prior to the seventeenth century. Typically, the stories involve the Buddha explaining to a group of disciples how a particular individual, through actions in a previous life, came to have a particular karmic result in the present. A predominant theme is the vast merit (puṇya) accrued from making offerings to enlightened beings or at stupas and other holy sites related to the Buddha.

== Contents ==
The anthology contains 38 avadana stories in all, including the well-known Aśokāvadāna "Legend of Aśoka", which was translated into English by John Strong (Princeton, 1983). The collection has been known since the dawn of Buddhist studies in the West, when it was excerpted in Eugène Burnouf's history of Indian Buddhism (1844). The first Western edition of the Sanskrit text was published in 1886 by Edward Byles Cowell and R.A. Neil. The Sanskrit text was again edited by P. L. Vaidya in 1959. The Aśokāvadāna part of Divyavadana compiled during 4-5th century A.D. by sectarian Mathura's Buddhist monks

Sahasodgata-avadāna, in the opening paragraphs, describe the Buddha's instructions for creating the bhavacakra (wheel of life).

Rudrāyaṇa-avadāna explains how the Buddha gave the first illustration of the Buddha to King Rudrayaṇa. According to this story, at the time of the Buddha, King Rudrayana (a.k.a. Udayana (king) ) offered a gift of a jeweled robe to King Bimbisara of Magadha. King Bimbisara was concerned that he did not have anything of equivalent value to offer as a gift in return. Bimbisara went to the Buddha for advice, and the Buddha gave instructions to have the first drawing of the Buddha himself send the drawing to Rudrayana. It is said that Rudrayana attained realization through seeing this picture.

=== List of Stories ===
This is the list of stories contained in the Divyāvadāna:

1. Koṭikarṇa-avadāna
2. Pūrṇa-avadāna
3. Maitreya-avadāna
4. Brāhmaṇadārikā-avadāna
5. Stutibrāhmaṇa-avadāna
6. Indrabrāhmaṇa-avadāna
7. Nagarāvalambikā-avadāna
8. Supriya-avadāna
9. Meṇḍhakagṛhapativibhūti-pariccheda
10. Meṇḍhaka-avadāna
11. Aśokavarṇa-avadāna
12. Prātihārya-sūtra (The miracles at Śrāvastī)
13. Svāgata-avadāna
14. Sūkarika-avadāna
15. Cakravartivyākṛta-avadāna
16. Śukapotaka-avadāna
17. Māndhātā-avadāna
18. Dharmaruci-avadāna
19. Jyotiṣka-avadāna
20. Kanakavarṇa-avadāna
21. Sahasodgata-avadāna
22. Candraprabhabodhisattvacaryā-avadāna
23. Saṅgharakṣita-avadāna
24. Nāgakumāra-avadāna
25. Saṅgharakṣita-avadāna
26. Pāṃśupradāna-avadāna
27. Kunāla-avadāna
28. Vītaśoka-avadāna
29. Aśoka-avadāna
30. Sudhanakumāra-avadana
31. Toyikāmaha-avadāna
32. Rūpāvatī-avadāna
33. Śārdūlakarṇa-avadāna
34. Dānādhikaraṇa-mahāyānasūtra
35. Cūḍāpakṣa-avadāna
36. Mākandika-avadāna
37. Rudrāyaṇa-avadāna
38. Maitrakanyaka-avadāna

== Selected English translations ==
Author	Title	Publisher	Notes	Year
Joel Tatelman	Heavenly Exploits (Buddhist Biographies from the Dívyavadána), ISBN 978-0-8147-8288-0	New York University Press	English translation of stories 1, 2, 30 and 36 with original Sanskrit text	2005
Andy Rotman	Divine Stories, ISBN 9780861712953	Wisdom Publications	English translation of the first seventeen stories	2008
Andy Rotman	Divine Stories, Part 2 , ISBN 9781614294702	Wisdom Publications	English translation of stories 18-25, 31, 32, and 34-37.	2017

== Original Sanskrit ==
Title	Publisher	Notes	Year
दिव्यावदानम्, http://www.dsbcproject.org/canon-text/book/364	Digital Sanskrit Buddhist Canon	Sanskrit original in Devnāgri script	2007
