= Keuning =

Keuning is a surname. Notable people with the surname include:

- Dave Keuning (born 1976), American guitarist
- Maartje Keuning (born 1998), Dutch water polo player
- Ralph Keuning (born 1961), Dutch art historian
- Wytze Keuning (1876–1957), Dutch school teacher, author, and classical music critic
