= ARTZUID =

Open-air sculpture exhibition in Amsterdam

- ARTZUID logo
- Status: Active
- Genre: Sculpture exhibition
- Frequency: Usually biennial
- Locations: Amsterdam-Zuid, Netherlands
- Years active: 2009–present
- Inaugurated: 2009
- Founder: Cintha van Heeswijck-Veeger
- Previous event: 2025
- Next event: 2028
- Website: www.artzuid.nl/en/

ARTZUID is a recurring open-air international sculpture exhibition in Amsterdam-Zuid, Netherlands. First held in 2009, it is centred on the broad landscaped avenues of Apollolaan and Minervalaan, which form part of H. P. Berlage's Plan Zuid. The exhibition is free to visit and generally runs for about four months, with sculptures and installations displayed in public space.

Stichting Art Zuid was established in 2008 by Cintha van Heeswijck-Veeger and a group of local residents. One of its original aims was to use sculpture to draw attention to the urban design and architecture of Plan Zuid. The exhibition has usually been organised every two years, with a different curator or curatorial team for each edition. The tenth edition is scheduled for May to September 2028, one year later than originally planned because of construction work on the Apollolaan and Minervalaan exhibition grounds.

== History and concept ==
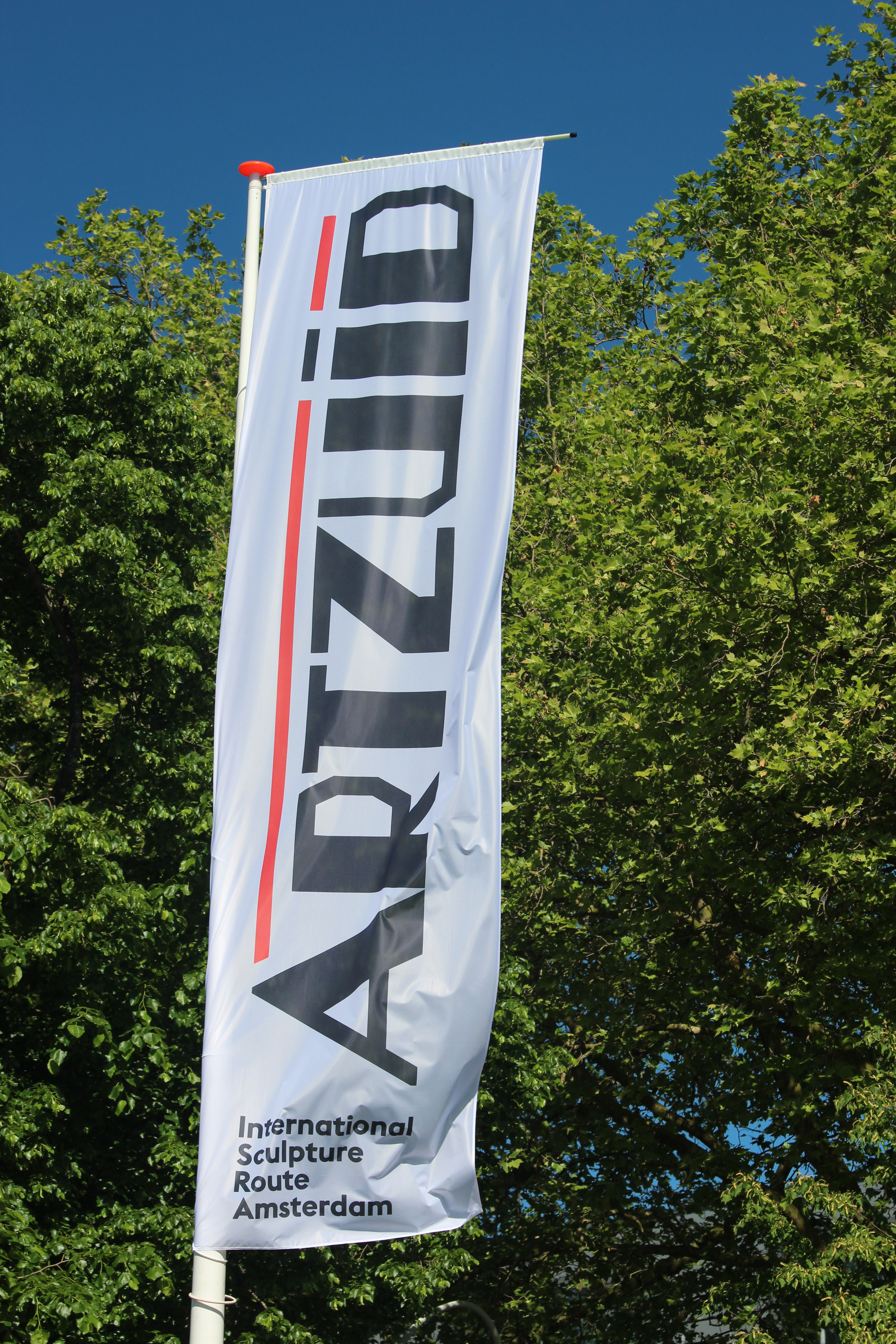
ARTZUID banner during the 2017 edition

ARTZUID originated as a residents' initiative in Amsterdam-Zuid. Stichting Art Zuid was founded in 2008, and the first sculpture exhibition followed in 2009.

The principal setting of the exhibition is Plan Zuid, the large southern extension of Amsterdam designed by architect H. P. Berlage. Berlage submitted his second plan in 1915 and it was approved by the Amsterdam city council in October 1917. The plan combined monumental avenues with smaller residential streets, large perimeter blocks, squares, waterways and landscaped open space. Much of its subsequent architecture became associated with the Amsterdam School.

The broad green central reservations of Apollolaan and Minervalaan provide the core of the ARTZUID route. Depending on the edition, the exhibition has also extended towards locations including Churchilllaan, the Zuidas, the Vondelpark and Museumplein.

In 2011 the project received an EU Prize for Cultural Heritage / Europa Nostra Award in the category Education, Training and Awareness-Raising. The jury highlighted the way in which the exhibition combined sculpture with Berlage's urban spaces and drew public attention to twentieth-century architectural and urban-planning heritage.

Queen Beatrix officially opened the 2011 edition. As Princess Beatrix, she also opened the 2015 exhibition and attended the opening of the 2025 edition.

== Editions ==
Year	Title or theme	Curator(s)	Notes
2009	Berlage in Beeld	Michiel Romeyn and Roberto Meyer	The first edition established the Apollolaan and Minervalaan as the core of the sculpture route.
2011	The World Around – Equality in Diversity	Jan Cremer	The second edition included sculptures on Apollolaan, Minervalaan and the Zuidas and was officially opened by Queen Beatrix.
2013	Engagement	Henk van Os	Sixty-one artists from 26 countries participated. The route extended through the Vondelpark towards Museumplein.
2015	Een vertelling in beelden	Rudi Fuchs and Maarten Bertheux	The curators selected 66 monumental sculptures. Groups of works were presented in a more museum-like arrangement along the route. Princess Beatrix opened the exhibition.
2017	Abstraction	Rudi Fuchs	The fifth edition coincided with the centenary of De Stijl and focused on the influence of Dutch abstraction on post-war sculpture.
2019	Interspace & Connection	Jhim Lamoree and Michiel Romeyn	The sixth edition focused particularly on figurative sculpture and on the exhibition route as a meeting place in public space.
2021	Imagine	Ralph Keuning	The seventh edition was developed in the context of the COVID-19 pandemic and addressed subjects including social inequality, climate, freedom, identity and the changing use of public space.
2023	Transfer	Jasper Krabbé	The eighth edition drew on pop art, neo-pop and street-art imagery and included both international artists and 25 Dutch artists.
2025	Enlightenment / Verlichting	Ralph Keuning	The ninth edition ran from 21 May to 21 September and coincided with the celebrations of Amsterdam's 750th anniversary. Keuning invited 70 artists, and Princess Beatrix attended the opening.
2028	TBA	TBA	The tenth edition is scheduled for May to September 2028. It was postponed by one year because of construction works on Minervalaan and Apollolaan; the curator is due to be announced in 2027.

== Relationship with public space ==
Unlike an exhibition within a museum or sculpture park, ARTZUID uses existing streets and landscaped medians as its principal exhibition space. The placement of works along Apollolaan and Minervalaan connects the sculptures with the urban axes and surrounding architecture of Plan Zuid. This relationship between sculpture, public space and Berlage's urban design was central to the Europa Nostra jury's assessment of ARTZUID in 2011.

The sculptures are generally temporary loans from artists, museums, galleries and private or corporate collections. The foundation also commissions works by younger artists for individual editions. Access to the outdoor exhibition is free.

The main information pavilion is situated on the central reservation opposite Minervalaan 1. For recent editions, the route has continued along Minervalaan and Apollolaan and, depending on the exhibition, towards Churchilllaan and the Zuidas.

== Gallery ==
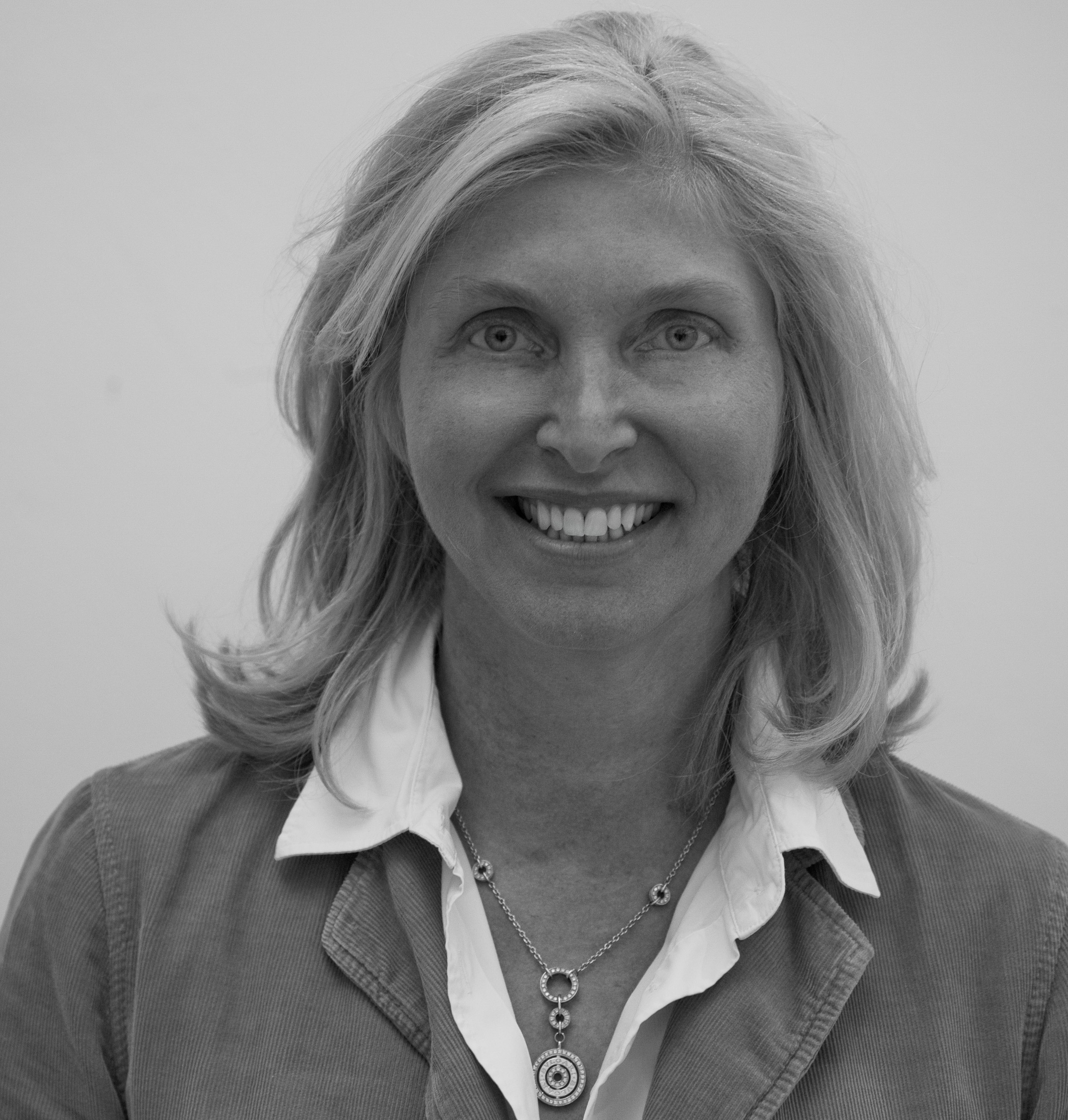
Cintha van Heeswijck-Veeger, initiator of ARTZUID

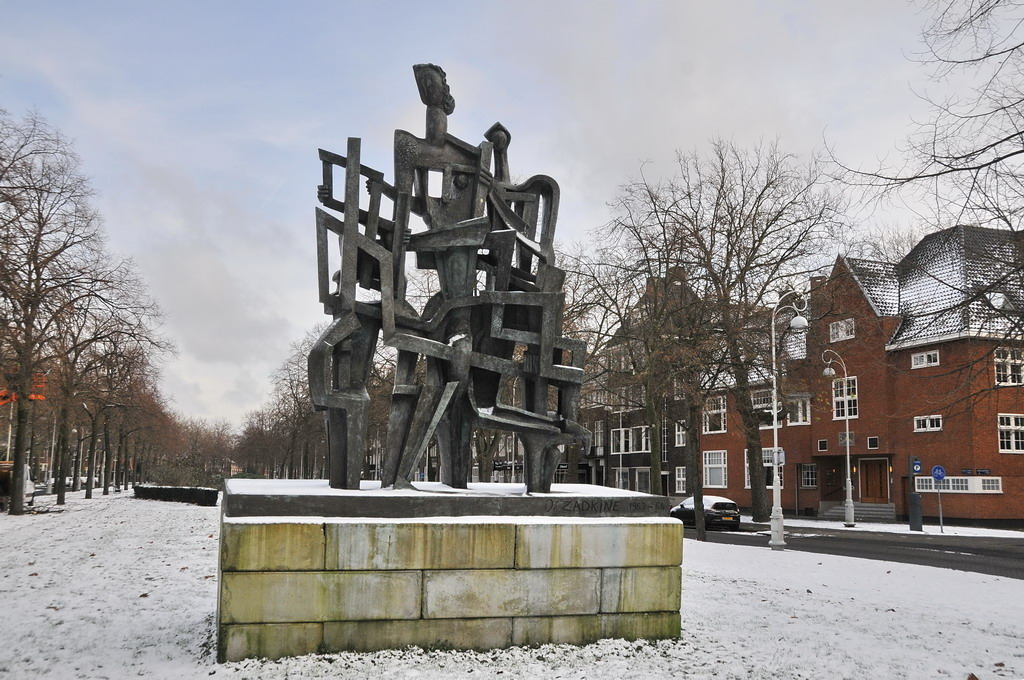
La demeure humaine by Ossip Zadkine, temporarily displayed on Apollolaan during ARTZUID

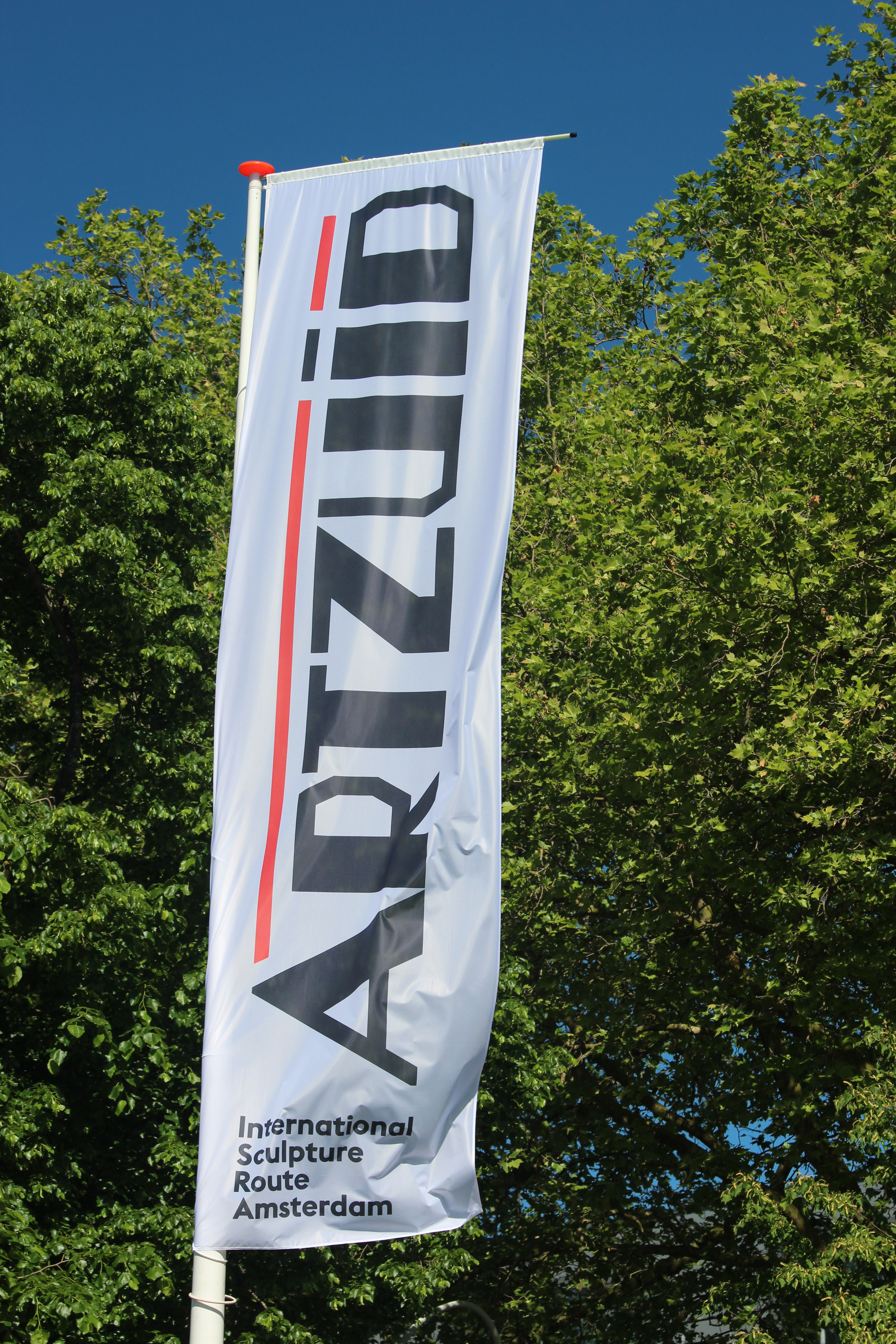
ARTZUID 2017 on Apollolaan

== See also ==
- Plan Zuid
- Public art in Amsterdam
- List of sculpture parks
