= Hans Josephsohn =

Swiss sculptor (1920–2012)

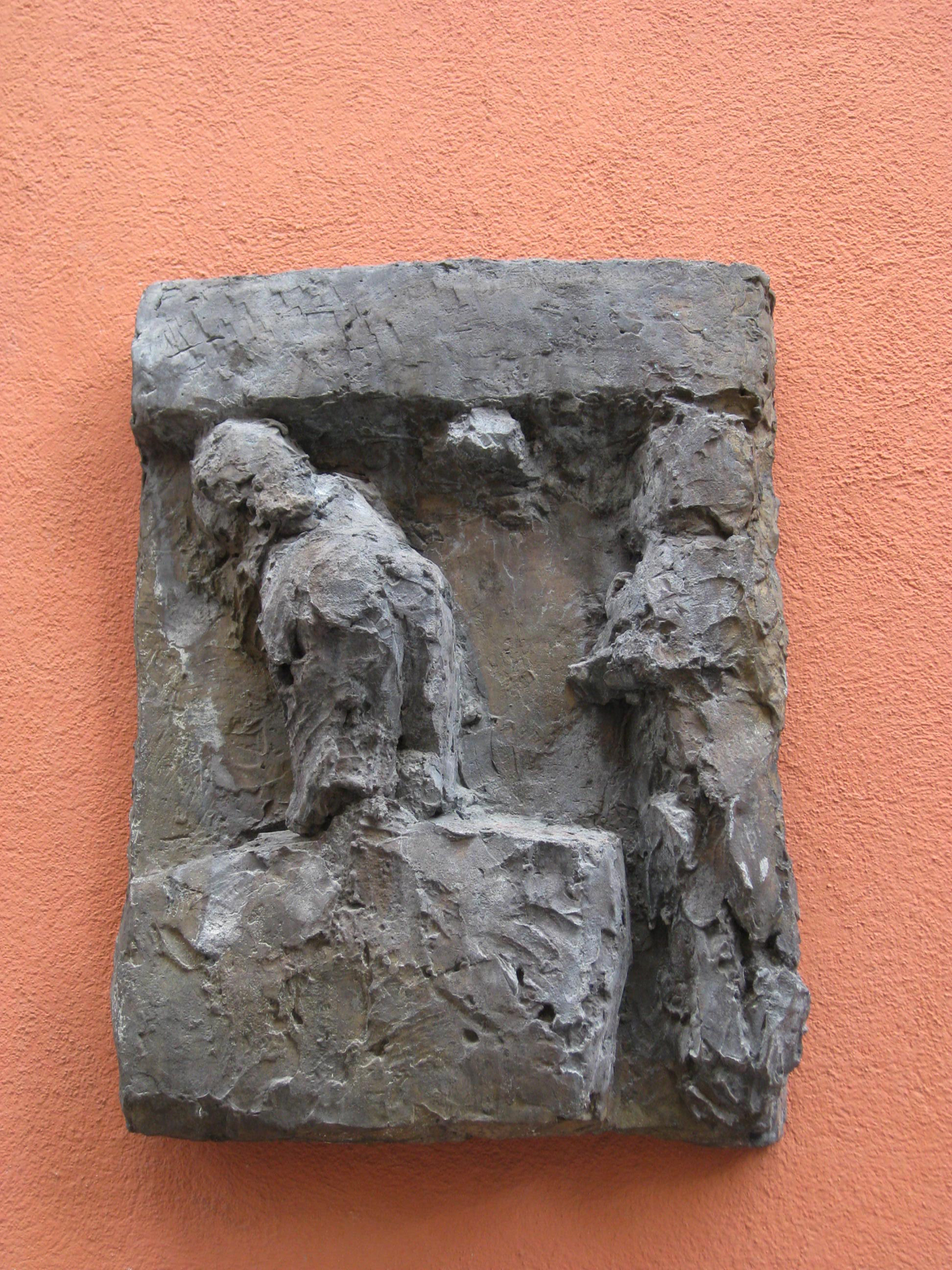
- Born: May 1920; Kaliningrad, East Prussia
- Died: 20 August 2012 (aged 92)
- Occupation: Sculptor

Hans Josephsohn (May 1920 – 20 August 2012) was a Swiss sculptor. He is known for sculpting human figures using plaster, clay, and bronze.

== Biography ==
Josephsohn was born in Königsberg (today's Kaliningrad), East Prussia. Here he attended elementary school and completed high school in 1937. That same year, he left his homeland and moved to Florence with a small scholarship, in order to study art. Due to his Jewish ancestry, he had to leave Italy a short time later and fled to Switzerland. He arrived in Zürich in 1938 and became a student of the sculptor Otto Müller. In 1943 Josephsohn moved into his first atelier, and starting in 1964 began showing his works in various solo shows within Switzerland. He acquired Swiss citizenship in 1964.

Josephsohn's works began to attract the attention of a larger audience at the end of the 1990s. The Stedelijk Museum in Amsterdam dedicated a large solo exhibition to the artist in 2002. In 2003 Josephson received the art prize of Zürich. Various group and solo exhibitions followed this, among others in the Diözesanmuseum Kolumba in Cologne (2005) and in the Palais de Tokyo in Paris (2007). In 2008, the MMK Museum für Moderne Kunst in Frankfurt/Main organized a large solo exhibition of Josephsohn's works.

In the years since 2000, Josephsohn's work has increasingly been regarded, also internationally, as a significant contribution to visual art.

Permanent installations of Hans Josephsohn's works can be seen at the museum La Congiunta in Tessin, Switzerland, which was built by Peter Märkli and Stefan Bellwalder and opened in 1992. In 2003 the Kesselhaus Josephsohn in St. Gallen, Switzerland, opened, where a regularly alternating selection of works is presented. At the same time, the Kesselhaus is functioning as a storage and archive for Josephsohn's works and it is located next to the Kunstgiesserei St. Gallen where Hans Josephsohn's works are cast.

Hans Josephsohn is represented by the Galerie Felix Lehner and Galerie Max Hetzler.

== Overview ==
Josephsohn's sculptures focused on the human figure as a volume in space. From the beginning of his career he worked, from the model, on sculpture's most timeless, constant themes: Representations of the human figure, standing, sitting, reclining, working on portrait heads or half-figures, made in plaster, some then later, cast in bronze.

Josephsohn's figures are bereft of any portrait-like individualization. And they stand out for their simplicity, for their being limited to the simple postures of the human body. The wish for permanence plays a key role: "My figures must be enduring in their expression, in their stance", Josephsohn said, "A narrative gesture is out of the question". His works evoke prehistory, ancient stone steles and romanesque figures.

Josephsohn's favourite working material was plaster. He found it ideal - simply it permits directness and spontaneity, both of which were necessary for Josephsohn's working process. Plaster allowed him to repeatedly add material or take it away. The directness of the work process was reflected not only in the immense vitality of the figures but even more by the traces left by this process. For example, finger imprints remain on the surface, referencing the artist's hands as it seeks to mold the material.

His artistic examination of the human figure was influenced and determined by his own experience, which for him as an artist, shaped above all by his everyday work in the studio but also by the interpersonal relations in his life. He found his models in his own personal world: They were for the most part friends, relatives - almost always women, very often his own life partner. Real persons are the starting point of this work and search for forms but his works hardly ever had portrait-like character or individual traits. Thus, also for those who knew Josephsohn's models personally, when viewing the corresponding works there is little to remind one of the individuals.

== Solo exhibitions ==
- Musée d'Art Moderne de la ville de Paris (oct.2024/feb.2025)
- Galerie Max Hetzler, London, England (2022)
- Galerie Max Hetzler, Berlin, Germany (2022)
- ICA Milano, Milan, Italy (2019)
- Museum Folkwang, Essen, Germany (2018)
- Hauser & Wirth Zürich, Zürich, Switzerland (2015)
- Kunstparterre, München, Germany (2015)
- Kunstmuseum St. Gallen, Switzerland (2014)
- Hauser & Wirth New York, New York, USA (2014)
- Ernst Barlach Haus, Hamburg, Germany (2014)
- Yorkshire Sculpture Park, Wakefield, United Kingdom (2013)
- Modern Art Oxford, United Kingdom (2013)
- Hauser & Wirth London, London (Piccadilly), United Kingdom (2012)
- Lismore Castle Arts, Lismore, Ireland (2012)
- Tomio Koyama Gallery, Tokyo/Kyoto, Japan (2011)
- Hauser & Wirth Zürich, Zürich, Switzerland (2010)
- Armory Show, New York, USA (2009)
- Hauser & Wirth Outdoor Sculpture: Hans Josephsohn, Southwood Gardens, London, United Kingdom (2009)
- Josephsohn Bildhauer, Museum für Moderne Kunst, Frankfurt am Main, Germany (2008)
- Hauser & Wirth London, London, United Kingdom (2008)
- Sculpture at Schönthal, Kloster Schönthal, Langenbruck, Switzerland (2007)
- Galerie Bob van Orsouw, Zürich, Switzerland (2006)
- Peter Blum Gallery, New York NY, USA (2006)
- Museum Liner, Appenzell, Switzerland (2005)
- Kolumba, Diözesanmuseum, Cologne, Germany (2005)
- Galerie Reckermann, Cologne, Germany (2004)
- Kesselhaus Josephsohn, St. Gallen, Switzerland (2004)
- Evangelische Stadtkirche, Darmstadt, Germany (2004)
- Museum Ostdeutsche Galerie, Regensburg, Germany (2003)
- Stedelijk Museum, Amsterdam, Netherlands (2002)
- Galerie Bob van Orsouw, Zürich, Switzerland (2002)
- Dům umění města Brna, Brno, Czech Republic (2001)
- Galerie Bob van Orsouw, Zürich, Switzerland (2000)
- Helmhaus Zürich, Switzerland (1997)
- Stiftung Landis & Gyr, Zug, Switzerland (1985)
- Aargauer Kunsthaus, Aarau, Switzerland (1981)
- Museum zu Allerheiligen, Schaffhausen, Switzerland (1975)
- Galerie Daniel Keel, Zürich, Switzerland (1969)
- Kunsthalle Basel, Switzerland (1965)
- Helmhaus Zürich, Switzerland (1964)
- Galerie am Stadelhofen, Zürich, Switzerland (1962)
- Städtische Kunstkammer zum Strauhof, Zürich, Switzerland (1956)

== Group exhibitions (selection) ==
- Zeit für Fragmente. Werke aus der Sammlung Marx und der Sammlung der Nationalgalerie, Hamburger Bahnhof - Museum für Gegenwart, Berlin (2019)
- Stunde Null, Kunst von 1933 bis 1955, Kunsthaus Zürich, Zürich (2019)
- Substance, Galerie Laurent Godin, Paris (2015)
- All back in the skull together, Maccarone Gallery, New York (2015)
- ArtZuid – International Sculpture Route, Amsterdam (2015)
- Spatial Positions 8: Kooperationen. Diener&Diener in Zusammenarbeit mit Martin Steinmann und Josef Felix Müller / Peter Märkli und Josephsohn, Schweizerisches Architekturmuseum Basel, Switzerland (2014)
- Il Palazzo Enciclopedico, Biennale, Venice, Italy (2013)
- MOVING – Norman Foster on Art, Carré d'Art – musée d'art contemporain, Nîmes, France (2013)
- Frauen – Liebe und Lebe, Lehmbruck Museum, Duisburg, Germany (2013)
- The Spirit Level, Gladstone Gallery, New York NY, USA (2012)
- Frieze Art Fair Sculpture Park 2012, Regent's Park, London, United Kingdom (2012)
- Common Ground, Architecture Biennale Venice, Italy (2012)
- Art and the City: Ein Festival für Kunst im öffentlichen Raum, Zürich-West, Switzerland (2012)
- Säen, Ernten, Glücklich Sein, Art-Public Chur, Switzerland (2012)
- Head: A gathering of primitive, abstract, iconic, lumpen, powerful, playful, referential, reflective, layered, delirious, precious, beautiful, psychotic, grotesque, detached forms, The Approach, London, United Kingdom (2010)
- ev+a. Exhibition of visual art, The Belltable Arts Centre, Limerick City Gallery of Art, Limerick, Ireland (2010)
- Visible Invisible, Parasol Unit Foundation of Contemporary Art, London, United Kingdom (2009)
- ING Discerning Eye Exhibition, Mall Galleries, London, United Kingdom (2009)
- The Third Mind, Palais de Tokyo, Paris, France (2007)
- Klaus Merz und die Bilder, Literaturmuseum Strauhof, Zurich, Switzerland (2007)
- Hans Josephsohn und Marisa Merz, Galerie Buchmann, Lugano, Switzerland (2007)
- Die obere Hälfte - die Büste seit August Rodin, Museum Liner, Appenzell, Switzerland (Travelling Exhibition) (2006)
- Architektur + Kunst - Dialoge, Kunsthalle Wien, Vienna, Austria (2005)
- Mind the Gap, Kunstverein Freiburg, Germany (2004)
- G 2003, Mostra Internazionale di Scultura all'Aperto, Vira Gambarogno, Switzerland (2003)
- Der verlorene Blick, Galerie Lelong, Zürich, Switzerland (2000)
- ron bladen, cris gianakos, max bill, hans josephsohn, beat zoderer, richard long, christoph haerle, richard serra, beatrice rossi und frédéric dedellay, Haus Bill, Zumikon, Switzerland (1999)
