= Ashoka the Great (book) =

2011 novel by Wytze Keuning

Ashoka The Great
- Author: Wytze Keuning
- Translator: J.E.Steur
- Language: English
- Subject: Ashoka, Ancient India
- Genre: Historical Fiction
- Publisher: Rupa Publications
- Publication date: 2011
- Media type: Print (Hardcover)
- Pages: 1057

Ashoka The Great is a fictional biography of the emperor Ashoka. It was originally written in Dutch in the form of a trilogy by Wytze Keuning in 1937–1947. These were translated into English and combined into a single volume by J.E. Steur.

== Plot ==
The book covers the story of Emperor Ashoka from his youth. He has just finished his education. He is a skilled warrior. He discusses the teachings with the holy Sayana, his guru.

=== Ashoka: The Wild Prince ===
The book narrates Ashoka's story of youth when he is referred to as 'the wild prince' by the people of his father's kingdom. He is not yet a king and he is unsure about what his father, Bindusara, thinks. Even Bindusara is not sure of what he should do. The laws laid down by the Arthashastra prompt him to proclaim Sumana, his eldest son, as his natural successor. But, he feels that Ashoka is more able. But, Sumana is supported by the Brahmin Council who should not be messed with. The Brahmin council has a huge control over the people in the kingdom, for they make people believe in their spiritual powers, when most of them have none. They use persuasion and vile to dissuade Bindusara from appointing Ashoka as the Viceroy of Taxila, when a rebellion breaks out. However, Bindusara is aware of all their doings because he keeps a network of highly trusted spies. He ensures that Ashoka does not face much problems in his journey to Taxila. He also tells Ashoka to never let down his guard. In his way to Taxila, Ashoka prevents a woman from committing Sati. When he reaches Taxila, he realizes that the people had rebelled only because they were not happy with the administration. Ashoka holds meetings with his courtiers and the foreigners and restores peace.

=== Ashoka : The Wise Ruler ===
This book covers his further encounters with the villains sent by the Brahmin court including the cunning Shakuni. He also marries the lovely and wise Asandhamitra, who h o believe in the teachings of the Buddha. This book takes the reader to Ujjain. Ashoka's children Mahinda and Sanghamitta are born. It ends with the Battle of Kalinga and remorse faced by the mighty emperor.

== Characters ==
- Ashoka – The Mauryan Emperor and the main protagonist of the story
- Bindusara – Father of Ashoka
- Devi – Wife of Ashoka, who bore him Mahinda and Sanghamitta
- Asandhamitra – fourth wife of Ashoka
- Sayana – a wise sage and adviser to Ashoka
- Kullika –

== Discovery of the original Dutch books ==
"The story is not just about a great king whose life choices greatly influenced world history, but also about the struggle of any spiritual seeker, anywhere in the world, in whatever era of time. Ashoka's quest and moral dilemmas are as alive now as they were in his days." - J.E.Steur, Translator

In the preface, Steur describes her 'discovery' of the books. After the discovery, she got in touch with Keuning's descendants, but none of them knew about this creation of Keuning. She discovered that it was written in the town of Groningen of Netherlands where the books were written first during the Nazi era.
