= St Nicholas Church, Deventer =

Coordinates: 52°15′07″N 6°09′47″E

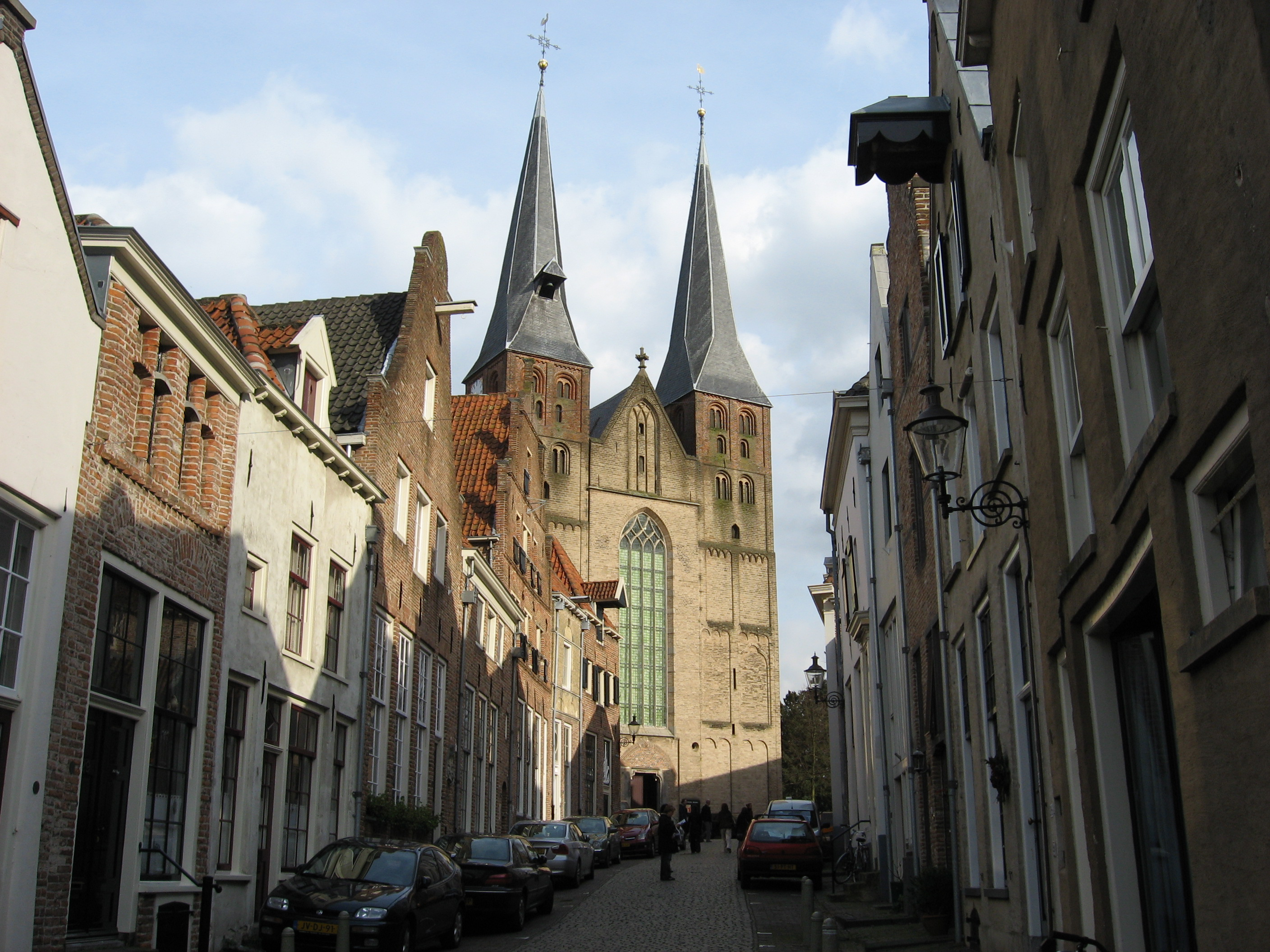
Bergkerk as seen from Bergstraat

The Mountain Church or Saint Nicholas Church (Dutch: Sint-Nicolaas- of Bergkerk) is a former place of worship in Deventer, Overijssel. This Romanesque basilica was built around 1209 and consecrated to Saint Nicholas. Centuries later it received some Late Gothic alterations. In 1580 the Dutch Reformed Church took the temple and renamed it the Mountain Church.

In 1967 the church was disestablished and its property transferred to the Municipality of Deventer. The building is used as an exhibition center and concert hall. From 1991 until 2005, the church was used for temporary exhibitions by Museum de Fundatie.

== Building and renovations ==
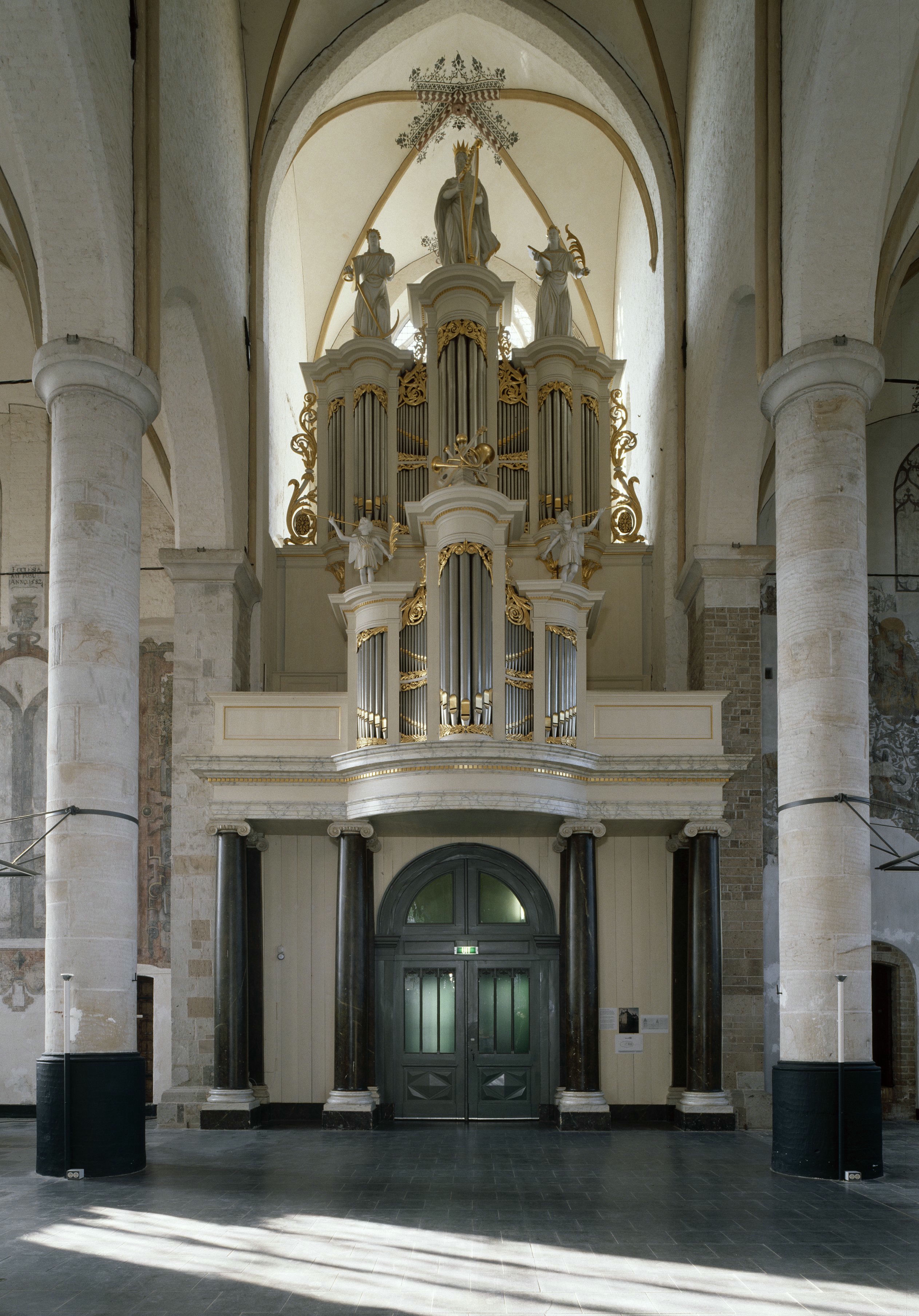
Organ in 2002

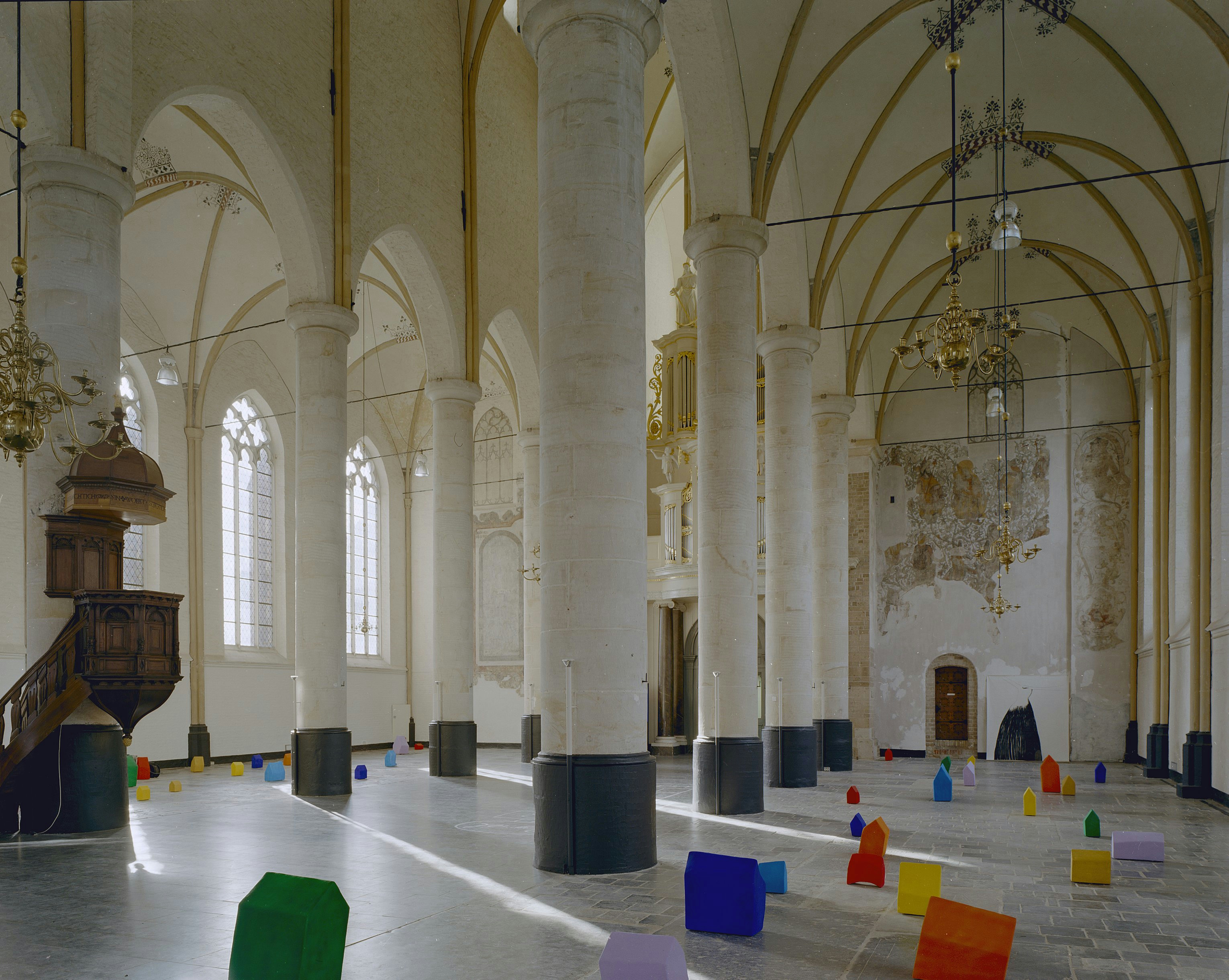
Interior during an exhibition of Museum de Fundatie in 2002

The Mountain Church was built between 1198 and 1209, near where the Deventer harbour section was at the time. It was founded in the golden age of the Hanseatic city. Its completion was dedicated to Saint Nicholas, the patron Saint of sailors, as the city Deventer took great advantage of their strategic position on the River IJssel. The church has a lot of features in common with churches from around the Baltic Sea.

In the fifteenth century the Mountain Church underwent several renovations, which gave it a more late Gothic appearance. The two characteristic tower spires are built in that period. The lower part is still original.

In 1580 went over to the Protestant church and all Catholic features were removed from the interior, which was very common to do. The wall paintings were covered with white chalk.

== Legend ==
There is a legend that describes how the building of the church came to be. Two sisters from Deventer, Martha and Beatrix, were heavily impressed by a knight who had come to Deventer. Both of them fancied the knight. Beatrix eventually married the knight, leaving Martha behind in solitude. Martha ordered the church to be built in peace with her loneliness, and let one of the two towers become slightly taller than the other one, since both sisters were of different height too. This should explain the difference in height between the two towers. The tower on the west (on the right hand stand when you face it) is the biggest one.

"In remembrance of the love of my sister and me, I want a church to be built from my money on the mountain. Two towers will be built upon it, one a little taller than the other, two children of one father alike and inseparable. So that will eternally remain the memory of our love and after our demise at any rate there be two towers that will not abandon one and another."

Another legend of the west tower is that it was taken under siege in the seventeenth century, by pirates on the river IJssel. A big stone ball, which appears to be a stone cannonball, can still be seen, stuck inside the exterior of the tower.
