= Dirk Hannema =

Dutch art collector and museum director

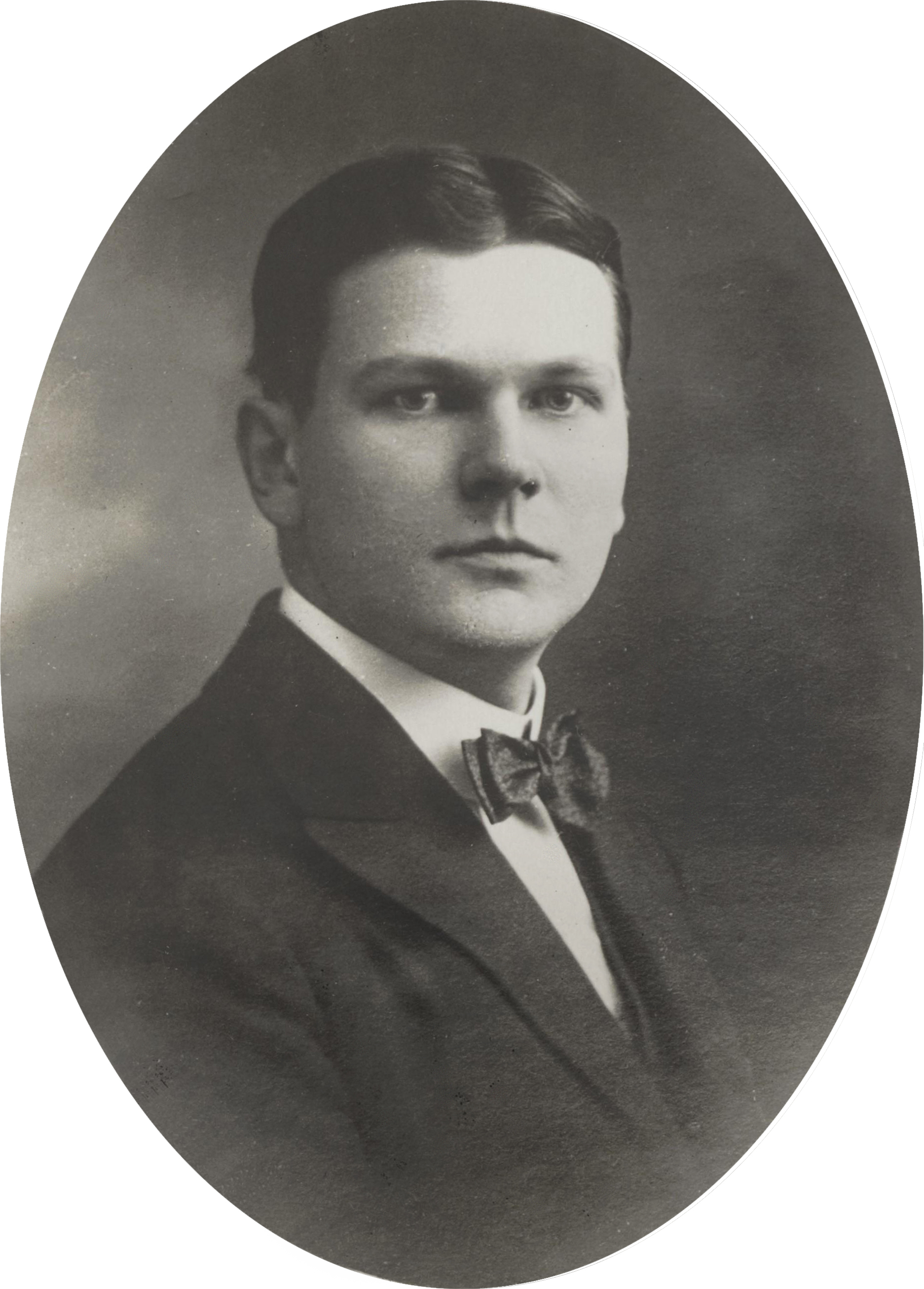
Dirk Hannema (1921)

Dirk Hannema (16 September 1895 – 7 July 1984) was a controversial museum director and art collector. The Museum Boijmans flourished under his directorship, but he was also arrested and interned for eight months for his conduct during the German occupation of the Netherlands during World War II. Further, his reputation was severely damaged when he inaccurately attributed various forgeries to the painter Johannes Vermeer, among others. However, a quarter century after his death, he was at least partially vindicated when Le Blute-Fin Mill, a painting he had championed (to universal scorn) as a van Gogh, was finally authenticated as being by the renowned painter.

== Early life ==
Dirk Hannema was born in Batavia, Dutch East Indies, the son of Dirk Hannema and Hermine Elise de Stuers. When he was five, the family moved to the Netherlands. After graduating from high school and fulfilling his military service, he studied law at Leiden University between 1917 and 1919, and then art history at Utrecht University.

== Museum Boijmans ==
He did not graduate, accepting a position as assistant at the Museum Boijmans in Rotterdam. When F. Schmidt Degener was appointed director of the Rijksmuseum, Hannema took his place as director of the Museum Boijmans at the age of 26. Under his leadership, the museum made some notable acquisitions. He was also instrumental in the construction of a new building, built by architect A. van der Steur in close collaboration with Hannema. The building opened in 1935. That same year, Franz Koenigs loaned the museum his collection of drawings. In 1938, Hannema acquired Christ and the disciples at Emmaus or simply The Emmaus, a painting he attributed to Vermeer. (In 1945, the notorious forger Han van Meegeren claimed it as his work.) Hannema was awarded an honorary doctorate by Utrecht University in 1939.

== World War II ==
During the Nazi occupation of the Netherlands for most of World War II, Hannema was pro-German. In 1940, he was involved in the sale of the art collection formed by Franz Koenigs to the Germans. The following year, he became a member of the Kultuurraad or "Culture Council", an advisory group of 23 pro-German "wise men" in the arts and sciences, and was put in charge of the country's museums in 1943 by Reichskommissar Arthur Seyss-Inquart.

Hannema was investigated for his role in the Nazi era art market by the OSS Art Looting Investigation Unit, which considered him to be a "Principal collaborator in Dutch art world. Member of Seyss-Inquart organisation. Adviser to Goering on art exchanges with Kroeller-Mueller Museum." He was placed on the Red Flag List of Names.

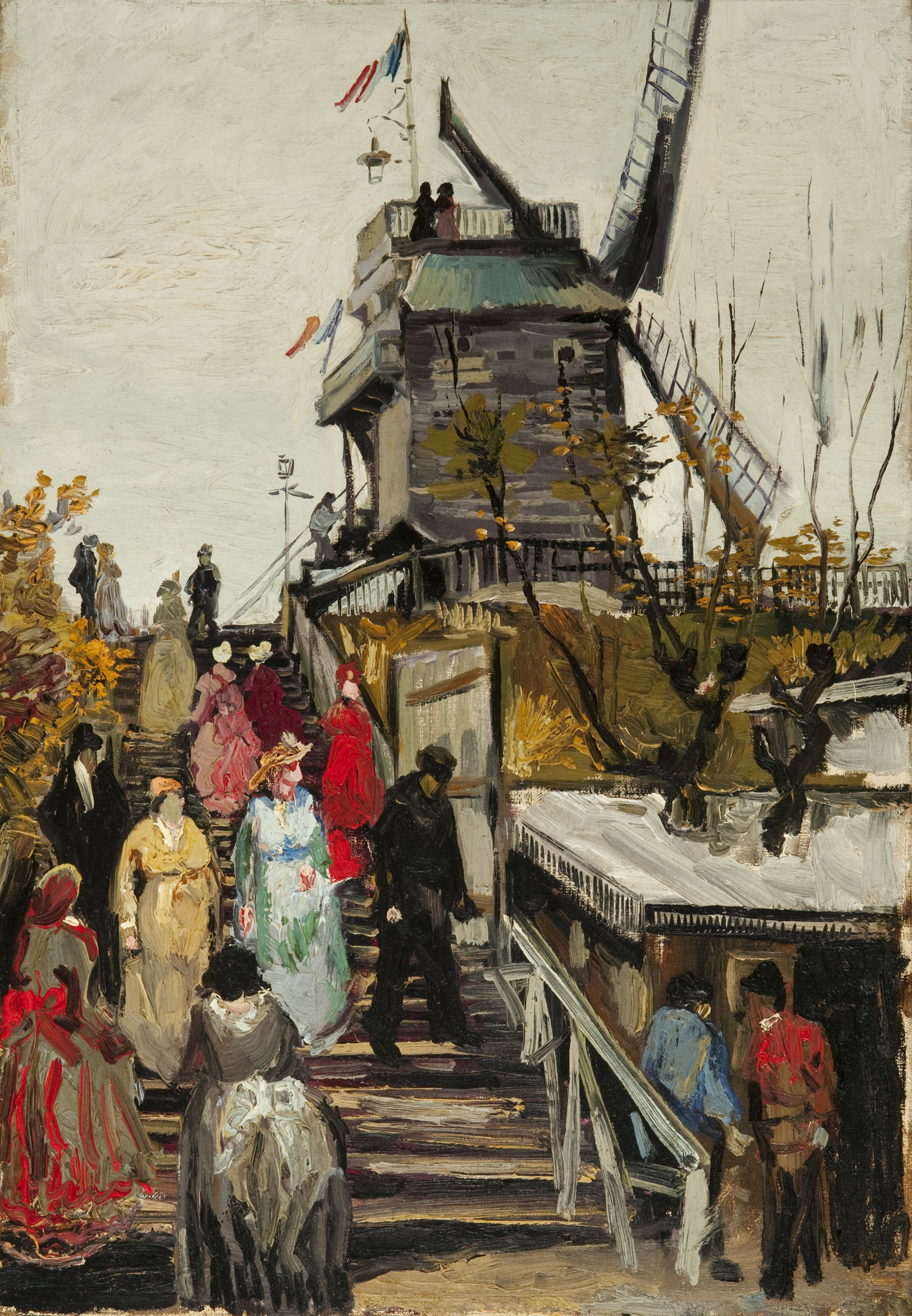
Le Moulin de blute-fin

After the liberation of the country by the Allies, Hannema was arrested and interned for eight months for the illegal sale of art to the Germans, but was never formally convicted and was released in 1947. However, he was dismissed from his position at the Museum Boijmans.

== Le Blute-Fin Mill ==
He spent the rest of his life expanding and exhibiting his private art collection. In 1975, Hannema purchased Le Blute-Fin Mill from a Parisian art dealer for 6500 francs. He insisted it was a Van Gogh, but could not get anyone to take him seriously because of his numerous earlier discredited claims.

He founded the Museum de Fundatie in Zwolle and bequeathed the painting to it when he died at Wijhe, Netherlands in 1984. Twenty-five years later, the Van Gogh Museum in Amsterdam finally authenticated the work as a Van Gogh, painted in 1886 in Paris.
