= Jan Cremer =

Dutch author, photographer and painter (1940–2024)

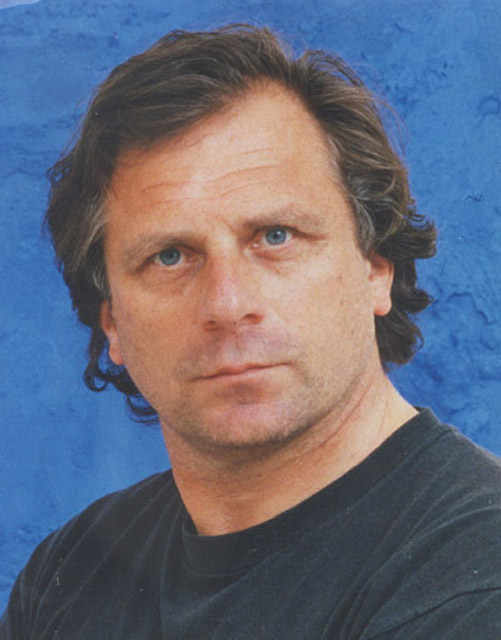
- Born: 20 April 1940; Enschede, Netherlands
- Died: 19 June 2024 (aged 84)
- Education: Academie voor beeldende kunsten Arnhem, Royal Academy of Art, The Hague
- Occupations: Author, artist
- Writing career
- Language: Dutch
- Years active: 1964–2024
- Genre: Autobiography
- Notable works: Ik, Jan Cremer
- Website: www.jancremer.com

Johan Cremer (Dutch pronunciation: [jɑŋ ˈkreːmər]; 20 April 1940 – 19 June 2024) was a Dutch author, photographer and painter. His best known work is the novel Ik, Jan Cremer ("I, Jan Cremer"; 1964) and the sequel Ik, Jan Cremer, tweede boek ("I, Jan Cremer, second book"; 1966). The publication of this book created scandal in the Netherlands because of its explicit sexual contents. He was also active as photographer and painter.

In 1963 Cremer and painter Rik van Bentum made an obscure comic strip together about the Profumo scandal, which appeared in print two years later.

Cremer died on 19 June 2024, at the age of 84.

== Public collections ==
Among the public collections holding works by Jan Cremer are:

- Museum de Fundatie, Zwolle, The Netherlands
- Boijmans van Beuningen, Rotterdam, The Netherlands
