= Ralph Keuning =

Dutch art historian (born 1961)

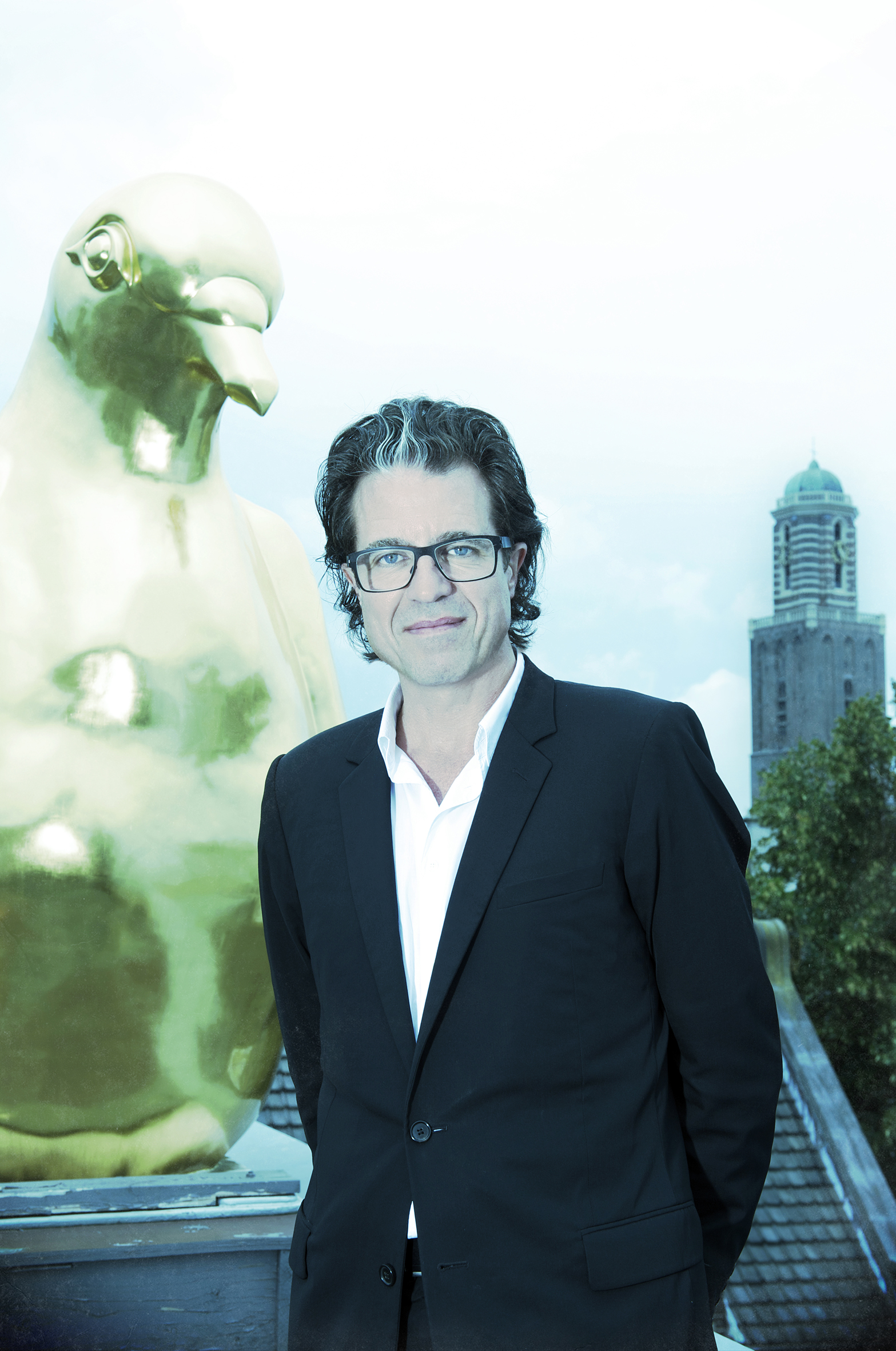
Ralph Keuning

Ralph Keuning (born 20 December 1961) is a Dutch art historian. He has been director of Museum de Fundatie in Zwolle since 2007. He resigned with immediate effect in June 2022.

== Career ==
Keuning studied art history at the University of Utrecht, focusing on the German Dadaist John Heartfield. Keuning served as an assistant at the Neue Nationalgalerie (New National Gallery) and the Print Room in Berlin (1990-1992). After that he worked at the Kröller-Müller Museum. He then moved to Lelystad to become the first director of the Nieuw Land Erfgoedcentrum (New Land Heritage Centre) in 2004.

Keuning became director of Museum de Fundatie in Zwolle, of which Kasteel het Nijenhuis in Wijhe/Heino forms part, in 2007. Under his management, the museum's extension was realised. It was designed by Hubert-Jan Henket, and opened by Princess Beatrix on 31 May 2013. Keuning expanded the collection with works by among others Jan Fabre, Marc Chagall, John Heartfield, Neo Rauch, Karel Appel and a series of works by Jan Cremer, including ‘La Guerre Japonaise’. In 2010 he presented the discovery of a painting by Vincent van Gogh, the 'Le Blute fin' mill, after it was researched and authenticated by the Van Gogh Museum. A still life from the De Fundatie collection was attributed to Jan Lievens in 2014, in cooperation with the Rijksmuseum in Amsterdam.

== Publications ==
Keuning has published on several artists, including John Heartfield, George Grosz, Marte Röling and Jan Cremer.
