= Wytze Keuning =

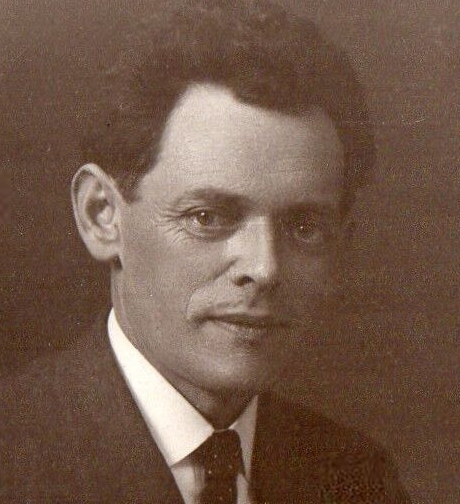
Wytze Keuning 1918

Wytze (nom de plume) or Wietse Keuning (official name) (21 December 1876, Tolbert – 18 December 1957, Groningen) was a Dutch school teacher, author and classical music critic. He was the co-author of three series of successful primary schoolbooks and one book of folk tales for young people. He wrote three novels situated in the northern part of Holland and a three-part three-volume fictionalized biography of Ashoka the Great. Keuning finished writing a two-part historical novel on Helena, the mother of Constantine the Great, but died before the publication process was started.

== Life ==
Keuning was born in nl:Tolbert in the community of Leek, Groningen to Klaas Jurjens Keuning, a house painter and later bar owner, and Grietje Wijtzes van der Velde. He was the second child in a family of eventually twelve children.

In August 1904 Wytze Keuning married Martje Vermeulen from his hometown. They had one son, Klaas Jannes (Klaas), on March 27, 1906. In February 1914 they divorced. His second marriage was to Frouwiena Abresch from Groningen on July 29, 1915, with whom he had another son, Frederik Johan (Frits) in 1918.

Keuning died on December 14, 1957, of a stroke.

== Teacher ==
Keuning became a primary school teacher first in Niekerk in August 1896, then in Helpman, municipality of Haren in August 1896 and in Groningen in August 1901. In July 1901 he took a head teacher's certificate. Due to health problems he had to interrupt his teacher's career from 1904 to 1906. During that period he worked as a reviser and editor of the newspaper nl:Nieuwsblad van het Noorden. In 1908 he took an English teaching certificate. From 1910 till 1913 Keuning was the headmaster of a primary school in Meeden in the province of Groningen. In 1912 he took a French teaching certificate. After three years in Meeden he returned to the city of Groningen to become a teacher at a secondary school. He remained in the city of Groningen and in 1927 was appointed headmaster of primary school no XV. When it closed in 1932 Keuning became the headmaster of primary school XX, in the city of Groningen, too. Because of a surplus of primary school teachers a law of March 1, 1936, stipulated that primary school teachers had to retire at sixty, so Keuning had to hand in his resignation in December 1936 and took leave of teaching on February 2, 1937.

== Author ==
=== schoolbooks ===
Wytze Keuning and Dutch author and librarian Josef Cohen worked together on several series of schoolbooks for primary education. They hoped pupils would absorb information on subjects like geography (Ons mooi en nijver Nederland, 1917, four volumes), botany and zoology (In het wonderland van planten en dieren, 1923, 1924, 1925, three volumes) more easily when presented to them in readable stories appealing to their interests. They also wrote a six-volume series of reading books for the older pupils in primary schools and pupils in continued primary education (Nieuwe Klanken, 1921 and 1921). In 1927 the Keuning and Cohen wrote a reading book of Dutch folk tales for the latter group, too.

=== short stories ===
In 1919 several Dutch newspapers published a total of four short stories (Blindje; De doode man; Te vroeg; In eenzaamheid)

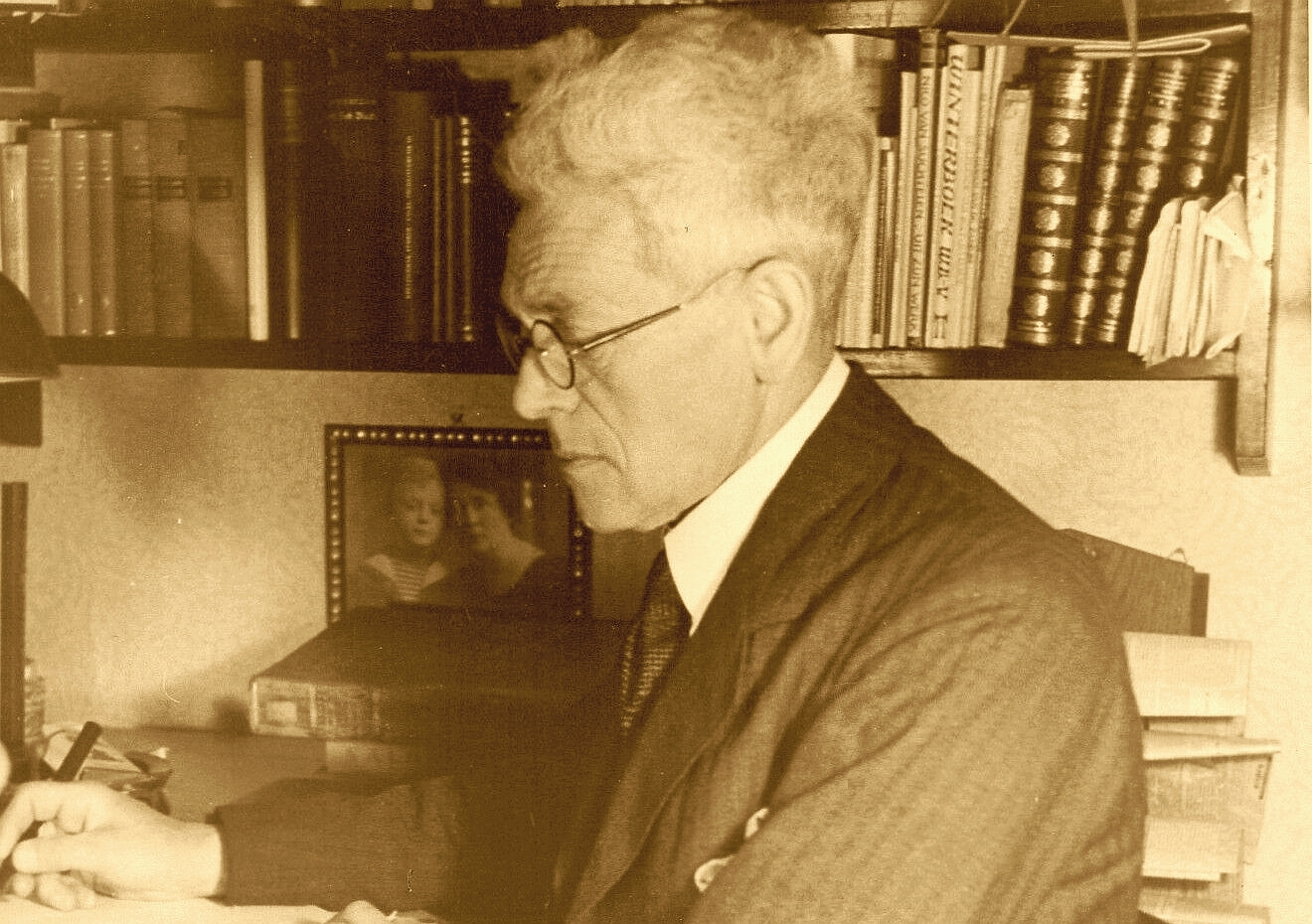

=== novels ===
- 1941 Asoka, De wilde prins, first part of a three part "Indische roman uit de derde eeuw voor Christus" (Indian novel from the third century BC)
- 1941 Asoka, De wijze heerser, second part of the Asoka trilogy.
- 1942 De Fakkel, regional novel about country life in the province of Groningen, with many dialogues in the regional Westerkwartier dialect
- 1944 Waarheen gij gaat, regional novel
- 1948 De grote maner, third and last part of Asoka
- 1950 Het Licht, sequel to De Fakkel, with some dialogues in the Westerkwartier dialect again

All novels were originally published by publisher Wereldbibliotheek, which aimed at publishing good and affordable reading.

In 1990 the first part of the Asoka trilogy was published by esoteric publisher Ankh-Hermes. The original formal, almost archaic style of language was mainly maintained.

In 2011 Ashoka the Great (see below), an English translation by J.E. Steur of the Asoka trilogy, was published by Rupa Publications, followed in 2015 by a paperback edition.

== Classical music critic ==
From September 1939 till October 1947 Wytze Keuning wrote some 250 reviews of classical music performances for the Nieuwsblad van het Noorden, a daily newspaper in the northern part of Holland. His reviews often offered not only an impression of the atmosphere, but also an expert review of the musical side of the performance. Anecdotes and historic facts were often added to the mix, turning Keuning's reviews in interesting pieces of prose.

Between August 1944 and the end of January 1947 Nieuwsblad van het Noorden was not published.

== The English translation of Asoka (Ashoka the Great) ==
In 2011 an English translation of the Asoka trilogy was published by Rupa Publications, New Delhi in one hardcover volume, titled Ashoka the Great. In 2015 a paperback edition was published by Rupa Publications.

The translation was by J. Elisabeth Steur, who worked on it for several years and together with the help of a number of editors adapted details of the original story in order to make it accessible and plausible for Indian readers. A few fragments from books by other writers were added, as well as a lot of notes. The translator explains her inspiration and motives for the translation and the adaptations elaborately in Preface and Epilogue.

A significant change is that Wytze Keuning dedicated the Asoka trilogy "to my wife", whereas the English translation is dedicated "For All the Teachers of India". Another notable change from the original novel is the translation of the title of Part Three. The Dutch "De Grote Maner" does not use "the World's", but simply says "The Great". The Dutch word "Maner", indicates someone who stimulates, who inspires and who cautions, rather than someone who teaches.

The titles of the three books in the combined English volume are The Wild Prince, The Wise Ruler and The World's Great Teacher.

Many readers were surprised by Keuning's knowledge of life and religion in ancient India, but Keuning was always thorough and meticulous in investigating facts and backgrounds concerning all his writings. And there were many publications about the subject and about Ashoka and his edicts in particular in Europe from the 1850s. The famous Dutch encyclopaedia, Winkler Prins, also had many entries about ancient India. So he could make a profound study of Buddhism and Eastern philosophy when writing the novels about Ashoka, who had only been confirmed to be non-mythical in 1915. In his research, he might have benefitted from his proximity to the University of Groningen, where Sanskrit had been taught since 1881, but there is no evidence of that.

He published the first two parts of "Asoka"/"Ashoka the Great" in 1941, during the 5-year-long occupation of the Netherlands by Nazi Germany. The third part was published three years after the German occupation, in 1948.

In an interview late in his life, Keuning said that he was "inspired by times of change in history".

Keuning died of a stroke in 1957 at the age of nearly 81.

== See also ==
- Ashoka the Great (book)
