= Museum de Fundatie =

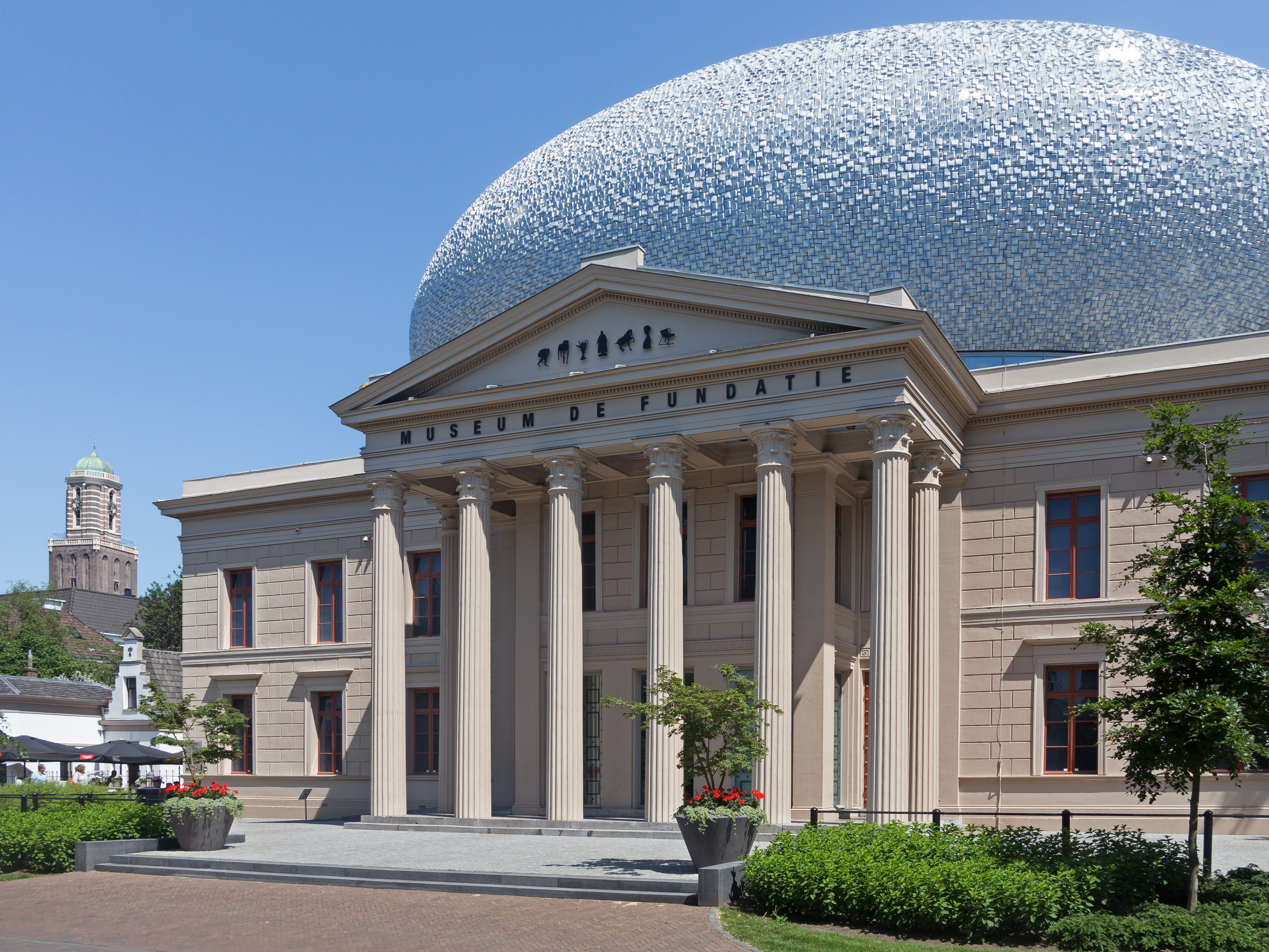
- Museum de Fundatie in Zwolle in 2016

- Museum location in Zwolle in the province Overijssel
- Established: 1958
- Location: Blijmarkt 20, Zwolle 't Nijenhuis 10, Heino/Wijhe; Netherlands
- Coordinates: 52°30′37″N 6°5′29″E
- Type: Art museum
- Collection size: 7,000+ objects
- Visitors: 285,000 (2016)
- Director: Ralph Keuning
- Curator: Karin van Lieverloo
- Website: www.museumdefundatie.nl

Museum de Fundatie (Dutch pronunciation: [myˌzeːjʏm də fʏnˈdaː(t)si]) is a museum for the visual arts in Zwolle, Netherlands. Museum de Fundatie forms part of the Hannema-de Stuers Foundation, to which Kasteel het Nijenhuis in Heino also belongs. Museum de Fundatie possesses a collection of visual arts, with works ranging from the end of the Middle Ages until the present day, collected by Dirk Hannema, former director of Museum Boijmans Van Beuningen. As well as the permanent collection, Museum de Fundatie organises new, wide-ranging exhibitions every three months. Museum de Fundatie recorded a record number of 310,000 visitors in 2015.

== History ==
Museum de Fundatie was founded in 1958. Its original location was Kasteel Het Nijenhuis, a 17th-century castle near the villages of Heino and Wijhe, which was the residence of museum founder Dirk Hannema.

From 1991 until 2005, the Bergkerk, a former church in the city of Deventer, was the secondary location of the museum used for temporary exhibitions. Since 2005, the Paleis aan de Blijmarkt, a former court building in the city of Zwolle, served as the second location of the museum. The location in Zwolle was closed for renovation on 8 January 2012 and reopened on 31 May 2013.

== Locations ==
The museum's collection is divided over two locations:

=== Museum de Fundatie, Zwolle ===
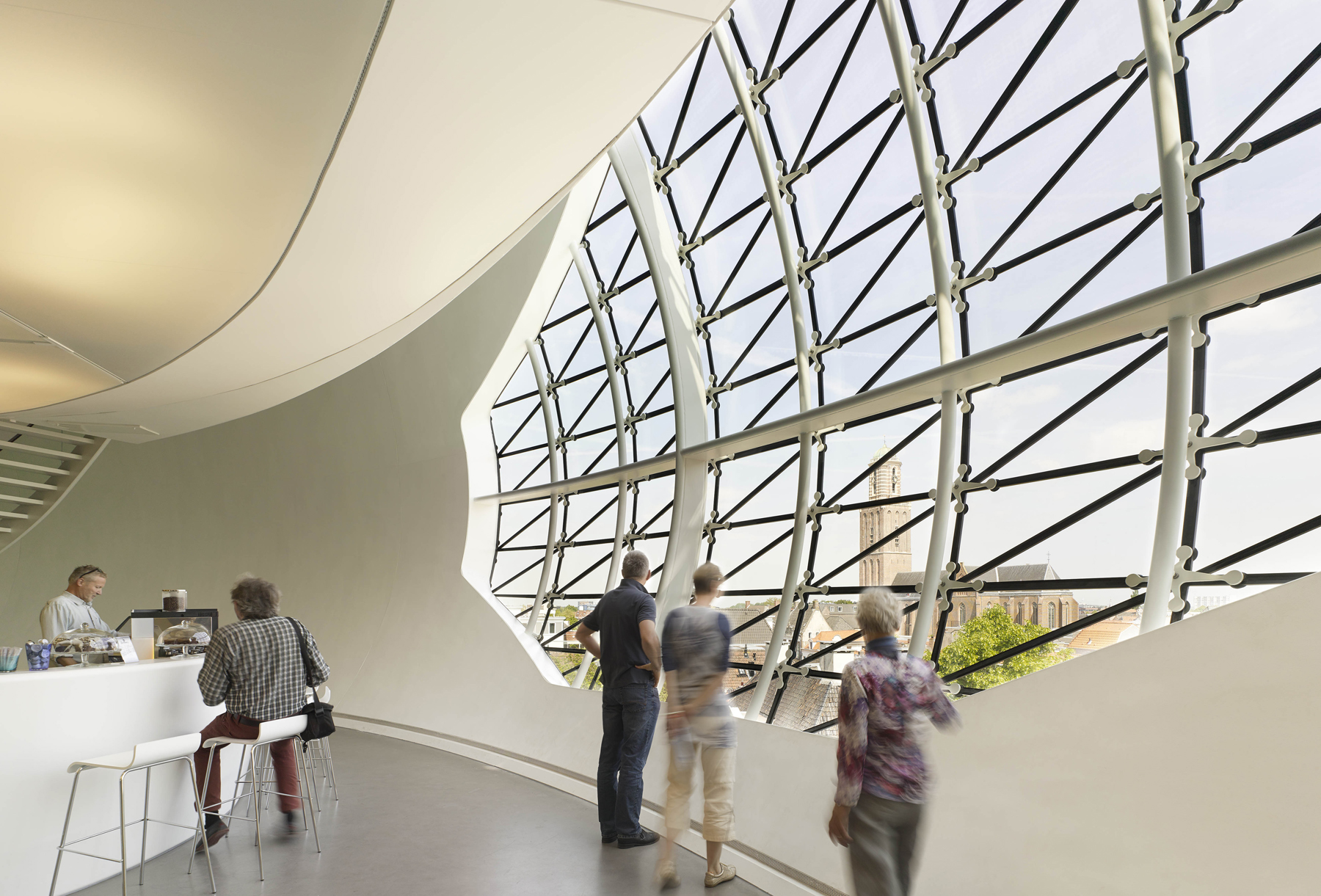
Interior of Museum de Fundatie in Zwolle in 2014

Designed by Eduard Louis de Coninck of The Hague, this former Palace of Justice was built in the neo-classicist style between 1838 and 1841. The court building was completely revamped by architect Arne Mastenbroek during the 1980s to serve as the new office for the national planning service's information department (RPD). Mastenbroek's second renovation in 1994 saw the palace become a fully fledged museum. Between 1994 and 2001, the building accommodated the Museum for Naïve and Outsider Art. In 2004–2005, the former court house was renovated by architect Gunnar Daan to offer space for Museum de Fundatie. The museum was expanded in 2012–2013 with the addition of new exhibition space on the roof of the existing building. This egg-shaped extension was designed by Bierman Henket architects.

=== Kasteel het Nijenhuis, Heino ===
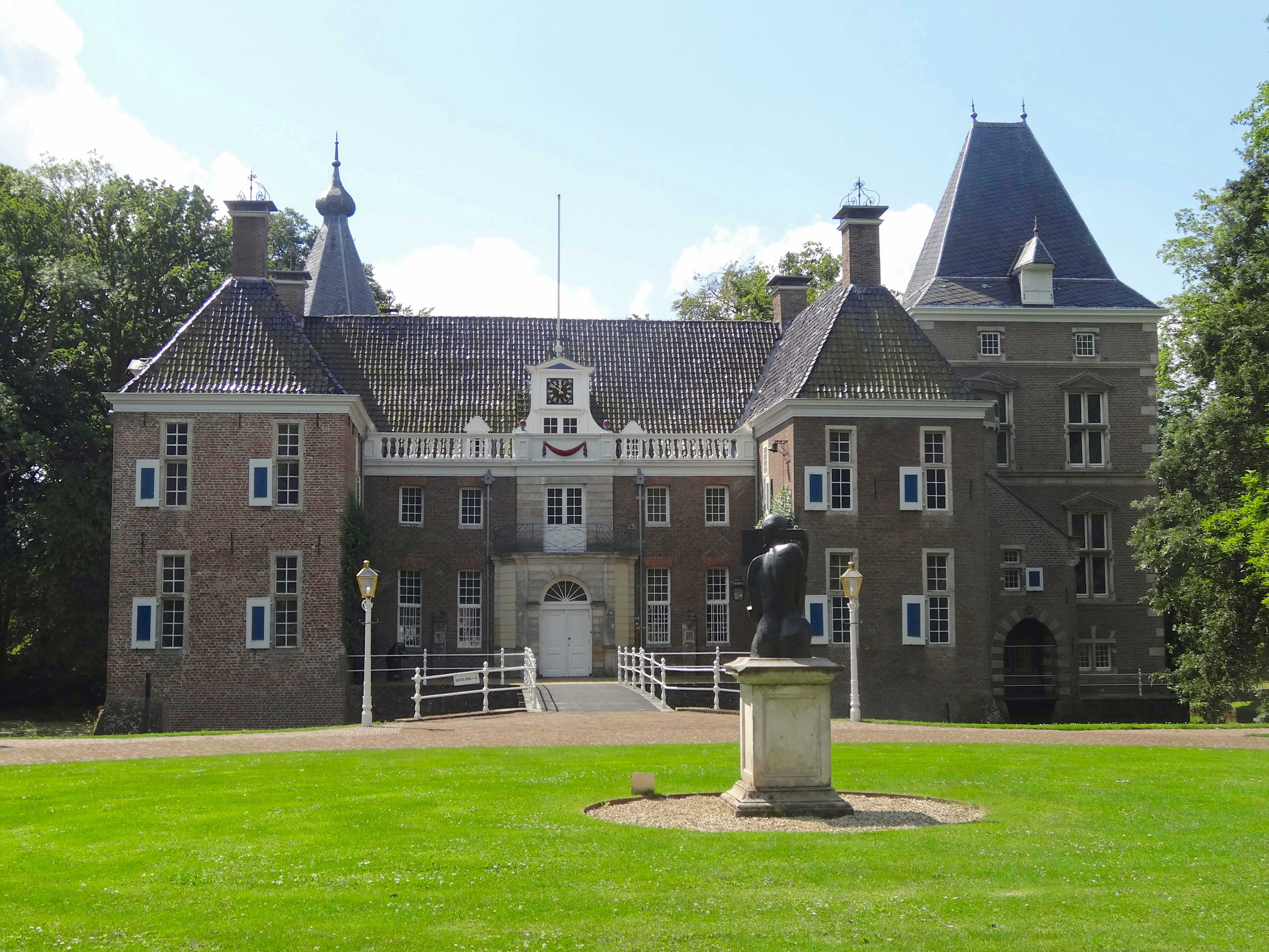
Kasteel het Nijenhuis in 2015

Built in the 14th century, Het Nijenhuis manor is situated near the village of Heino. Officially however, it lies within the municipality of Olst-Wijhe. The building belongs to the Province of Overijssel and Dirk Hannema lived here from 1958 until his death in 1984. Art collector Hannema was, among other things, the director of Museum Boijmans Van Beuningen. He left his collection to the Hannema-de Stuers Foundation and therefore to Museum De Fundatie. Het Nijenhuis was opened to the public after restoration in 2004. The sculpture garden surrounding the manor is one of the Netherlands' larger ones. The garden displays more than ninety 20th and 21st century sculptures, featuring both nationally and internationally renowned artists.

== Collection ==
The museum collection is originally based on the eclectic art collection of Dirk Hannema, former museum director of Museum Boijmans Van Beuningen in Rotterdam. Since 1993, the collection of the Province of Overijssel is also managed by the museum.

The collection contains over 7,000 paintings, drawings, prints, sculptures, and other objects. Among these works are paintings of Marc Chagall, Piet Mondrian, Isaac Israëls, Vincent van Gogh, Lucebert, Paul Citroen, Karel Appel, and Carel Willink, and sculptures by Antonio Canova and Gian Lorenzo Bernini.

In 2010, the Van Gogh painting The blute-fin mill (1886) was authenticated by the Van Gogh Museum.

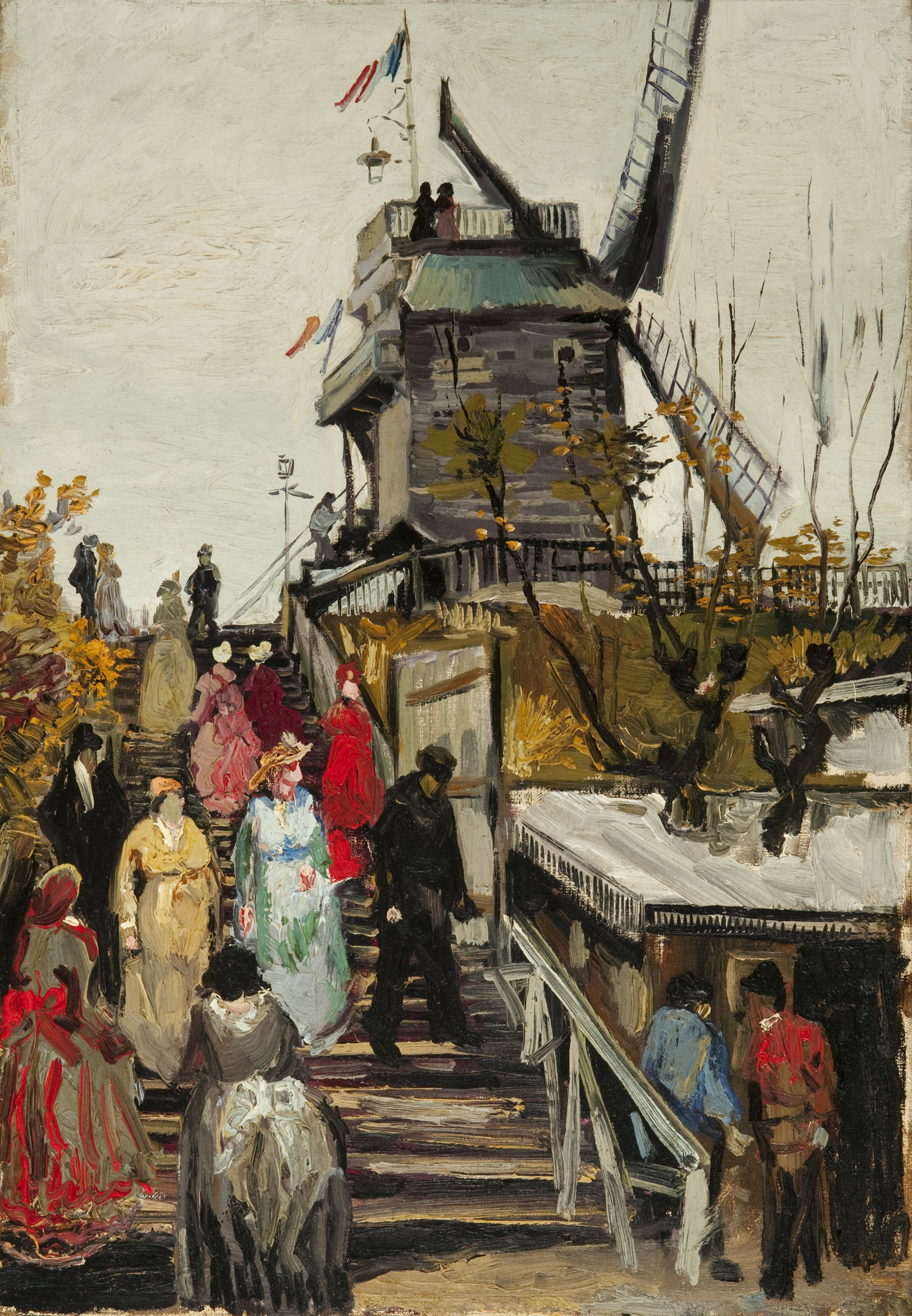
The blute-fin mill (1886) by Vincent van Gogh

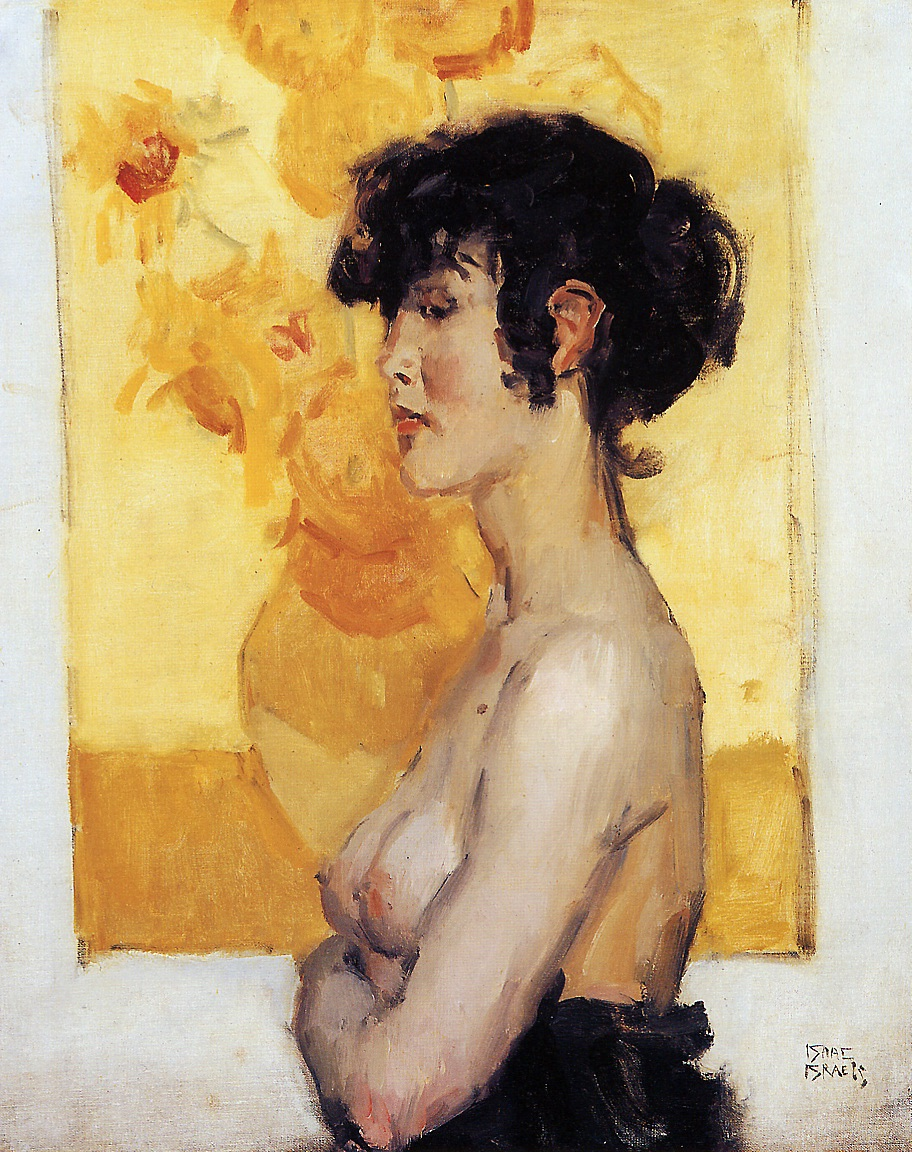
Woman in profile in front of Van Gogh's sunflowers (1917) by Isaac Israëls

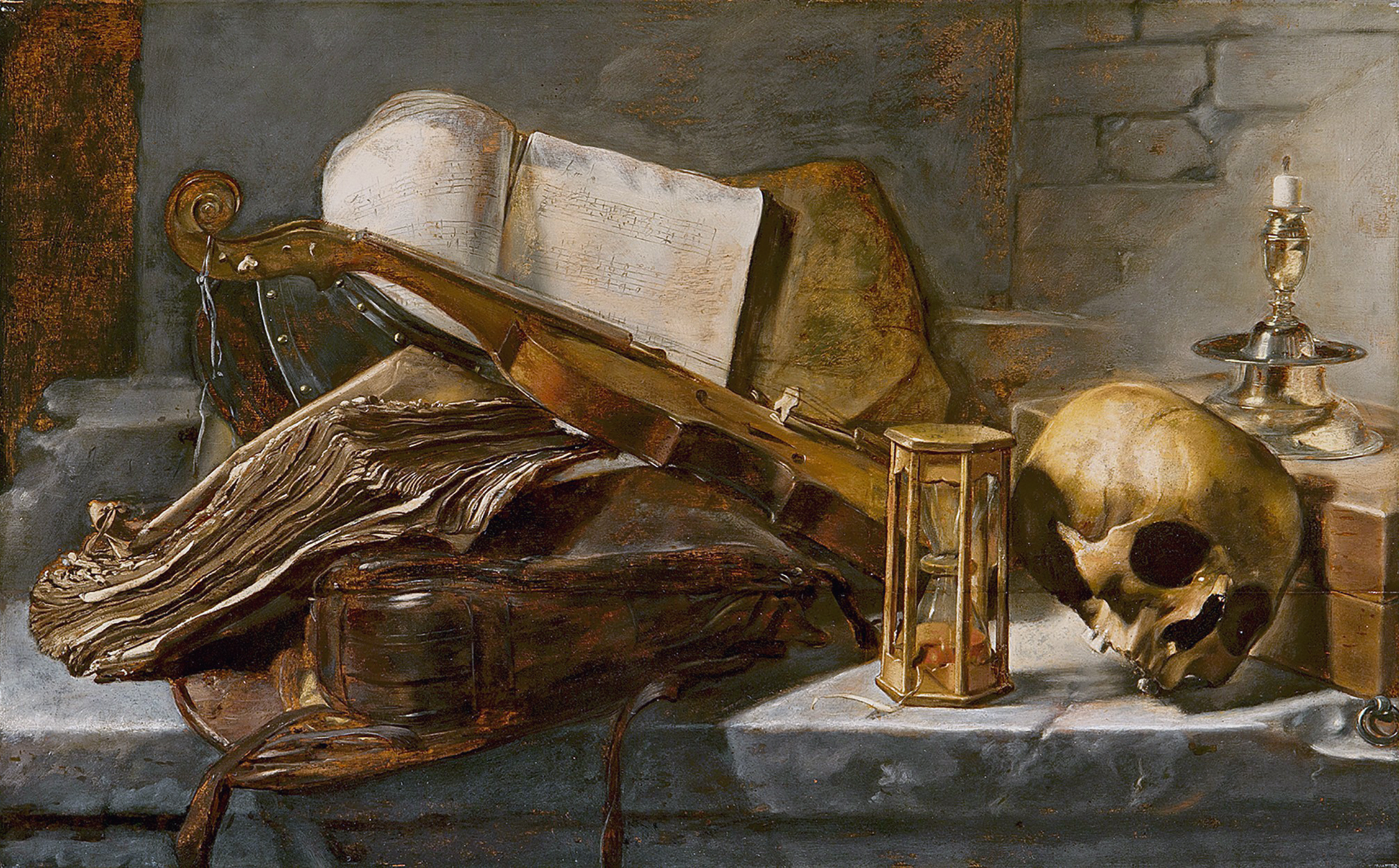
Vanitas still life (1627), attributed to Jan Lievens

== Administration ==
Year	Visitors		
Year	Zwolle	Heino	Total
2006			30,000 (est.)
2007			63,000 (est.)
2008			117,000 (est.)
2009	46,244	20,624	66,868
2010	87,120	40,397	127,517
2011	88,907	31,297	120,204
2012	3,918	62,265	66,183
2013	175,160	51,234	226,394
2014			261,500 (est.)
2015			310,000 (est.)
2016	230,000 (est.)	55,000 (est.)	285,000 (est.)

In 2013, the museum had 34 employees (20.26 full-time equivalent or fte). Ralph Keuning has been the museum director since 2007. He resigned in 2022.

The entrance fee for either location of the museum is € 9, the reduced price for students is € 6, and children under 17 years have free admission.

In 2013, the museum had 226,394 visitors, of which 175,160 were in Zwolle and 51,234 in Heino/Wijhe. In 2014 and 2015, the museum had record numbers of 261,500 and 310,000 visitors.

The museum has agreed, in 2021, to pay a compensation for the claimants representing Mr. Richard Semmel, a German Jewish industrialist from Berlin, who fled Nazi Germany in 1933, for the 1635 painting, Bernardo Strozzi’s Christ and the Samaritan Woman at the Well. In 2013, the Dutch Restitutions Committee had previously denied the right of the claimants " on the grounds that the works are more important to the museums which house them now than they are to the heirs." causing an outcry. Finally, following a critical review of the Restitutions Committee’s work that called for more “humanity, transparency and goodwill", the Museum de Fundatie decided to negotiate a compensation with Mr. Semmel's representatives.

Museum de Fundatie is a member of the Museumvereniging (Museum Association).
