= Pillars of Ashoka =

Series of monolithic columns on the Indian subcontinent

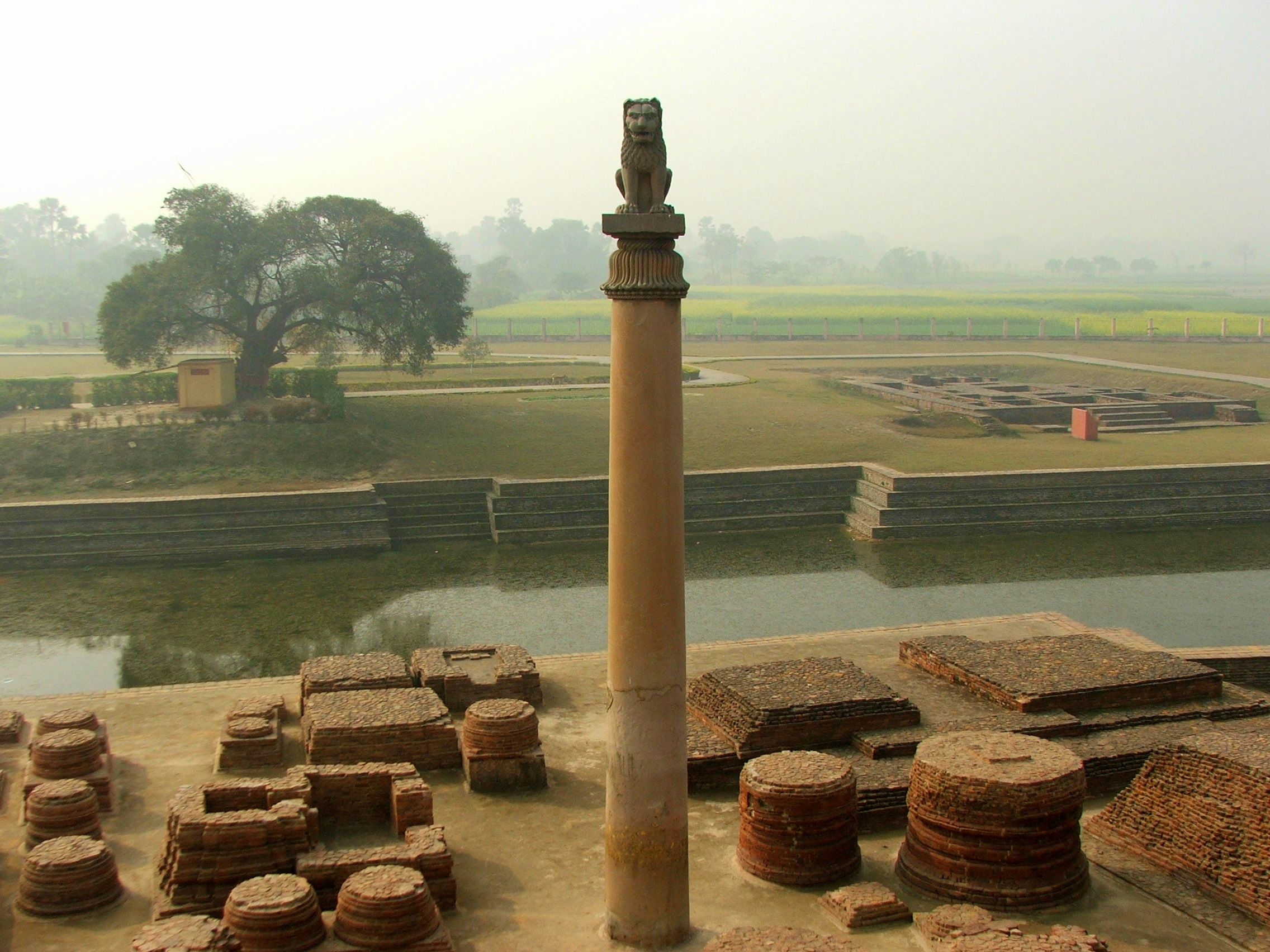
- One of the Pillars of Ashoka, in Vaishali
- Material: Polished sandstone
- Period/culture: 3rd century BC

Location
- Known locations of the Pillars of Ashoka

The pillars of Ashoka are a series of monolithic columns dispersed throughout the Indian subcontinent, erected—or at least inscribed with edicts—by the 3rd Mauryan Emperor Ashoka the Great, who reigned from c. 268 to 232 BC. Ashoka used the expression Dhaṃma thaṃbhā (Dharma stambha), i.e. "pillars of the Dharma" to describe his own pillars. These pillars constitute important monuments of the architecture of India, most of them exhibiting the characteristic Mauryan polish. Twenty of the pillars erected by Ashoka still survive, including those with inscriptions of his edicts. Only a few with animal capitals survive of which seven complete specimens are known. Two pillars were relocated by Firuz Shah Tughlaq to Delhi. Several pillars were relocated later by Mughal Empire rulers, the animal capitals being removed. Averaging between 12 and 15 m (40 and 50 ft) in height, and weighing up to 50 tons each, the pillars were dragged, sometimes hundreds of miles, to where they were erected.

The pillars of Ashoka are among the earliest known stone sculptural remains from India. Only another pillar fragment, the Pataliputra capital, is possibly from a slightly earlier date. It is thought that before the 3rd century BC, wood rather than stone was used as the main material for Indian architectural constructions, and that stone may have been adopted following interaction with the Persians and the Greeks. A graphic representation of the Lion Capital of Ashoka from the column there was adopted as the official State Emblem of India in 1950.

All the pillars of Ashoka were built at Buddhist monasteries, many important sites from the life of the Buddha and places of pilgrimage. Some of the columns carry inscriptions addressed to the monks and nuns. Some were erected to commemorate visits by Ashoka. Major pillars are present in the Indian States of Bihar, Uttar Pradesh, Madhya Pradesh and some parts of Haryana.

== Ashoka and Buddhism ==
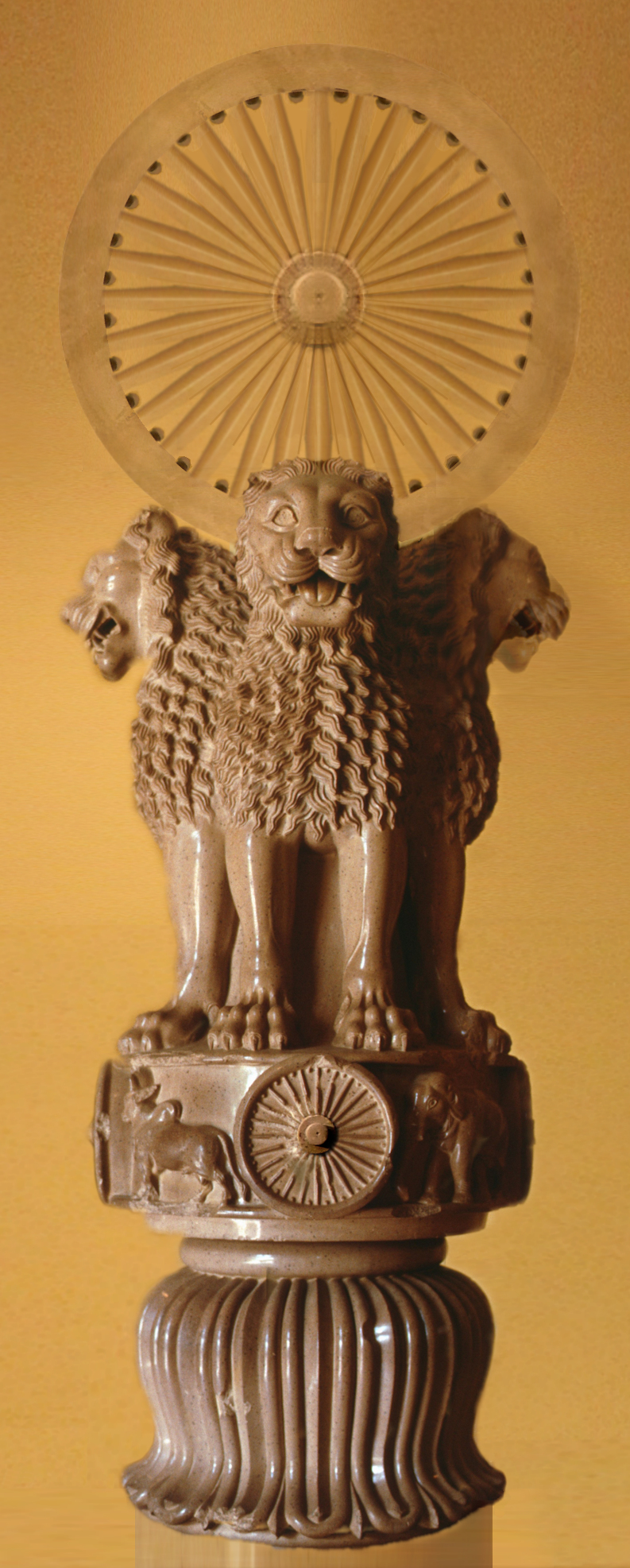
Lion Capital of Ashoka from Sarnath, with Wheel of the Moral Law (reconstitution). 3rd century BC.

Ashoka ascended to the throne in 269 BC inheriting the Mauryan Empire founded by his grandfather Chandragupta Maurya. Ashoka was reputedly a tyrant at the outset of his reign. Eight years after his accession he campaigned in Kalinga where in his own words, "a hundred and fifty thousand people were deported, a hundred thousand were killed and as many as that perished..." As he explains in his edicts, after this event Ashoka converted to Buddhism in remorse for the loss of life. Buddhism became a state religion and with Ashoka's support it spread rapidly. The inscriptions on the pillars set out edicts about morality based on Buddhist tenets. They were added in the 3rd century BC.

== Construction ==
The traditional idea that all were originally quarried at Chunar, just south of Varanasi and taken to their sites, before or after carving, "can no longer be confidently asserted", and instead it seems that the columns were carved in two types of stone. Some were of the spotted red and white sandstone from the region of Mathura, the others of buff-colored fine grained hard sandstone usually with small black spots quarried in the Chunar near Varanasi. The uniformity of style in the pillar capitals suggests that they were all sculpted by craftsmen from the same region. It would therefore seem that stone was transported from Mathura and Chunar to the various sites where the pillars have been found, and there was cut and carved by craftsmen.

The pillars have four component parts in two pieces: the three sections of the capitals are made in a single piece, often of a different stone to that of the monolithic shaft to which they are attached by a large metal dowel. The shafts are always plain and smooth, circular in cross-section, slightly tapering upwards and always chiselled out of a single piece of stone. There is no distinct base at the bottom of the shaft. The lower parts of the capitals have the shape and appearance of a gently arched bell formed of lotus petals. The abaci are of two types: square and plain and circular and decorated and these are of different proportions. The crowning animals are masterpieces of Mauryan art, shown either seated or standing, always in the round and chiselled as a single piece with the abaci. Presumably all or most of the other columns that now lack them once had capitals and animals. They are also used to commemorate the events of the Buddha's life.

Lion designs
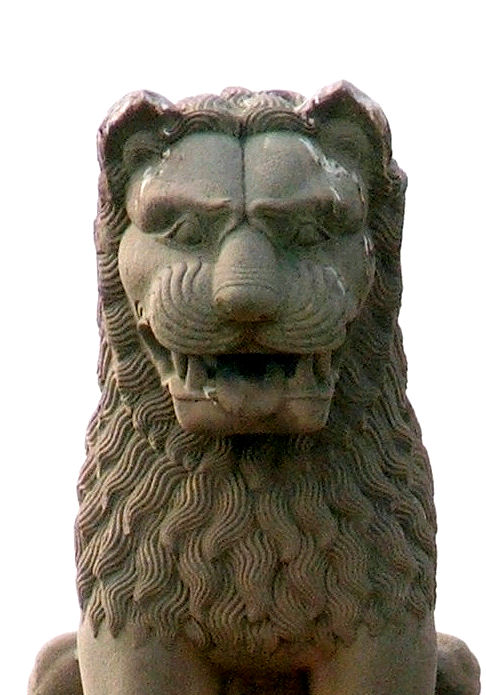
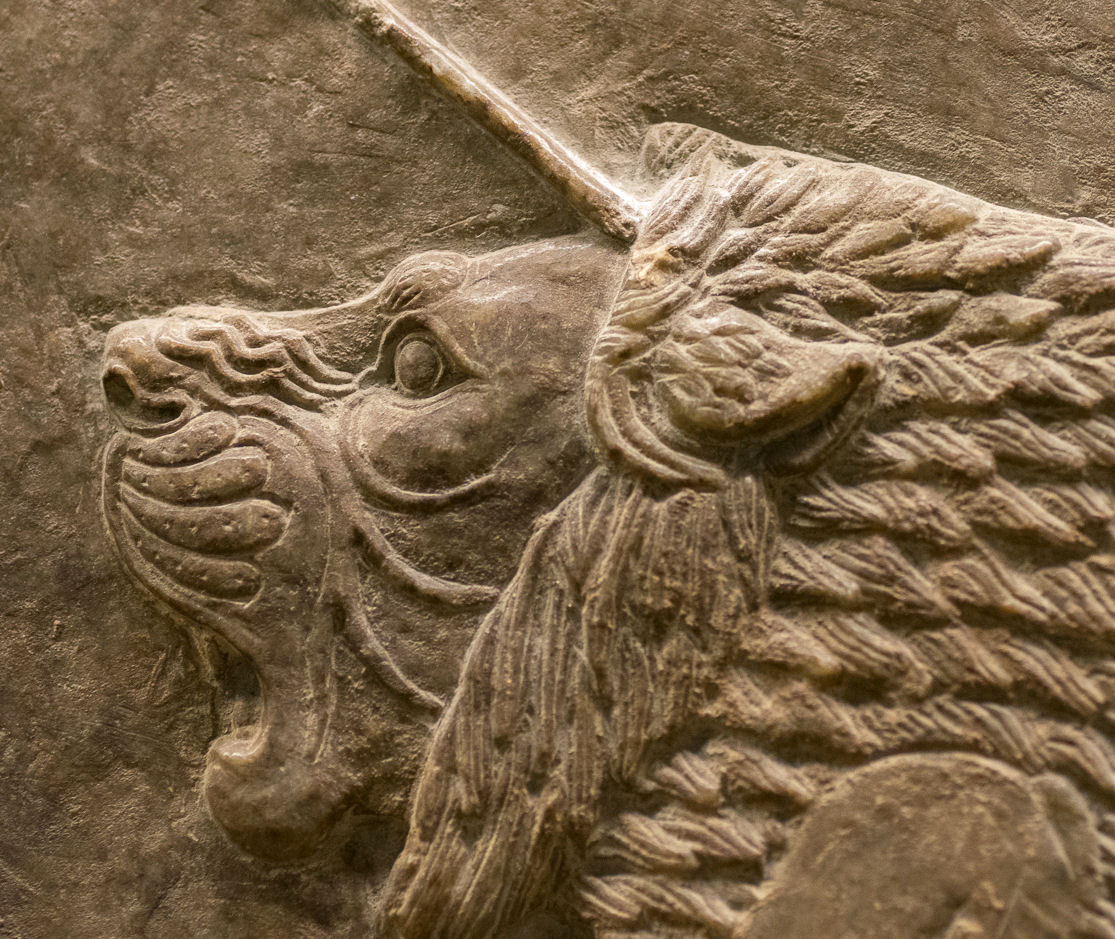
Left image: Vaishali lion of Ashoka. Right image: Assyrian relief of a lion at Nineveh (c. 640 BC). Many stylistic elements (design of the whiskers, the eyes, the fur etc...) point to similarities.

Currently seven animal sculptures from Ashoka pillars survive. These form "the first important group of Indian stone sculpture", though it is thought they derive from an existing tradition of wooden columns topped by animal sculptures in copper, none of which have survived. It is also possible that some of the stone pillars predate Ashoka's reign.

Floral designs
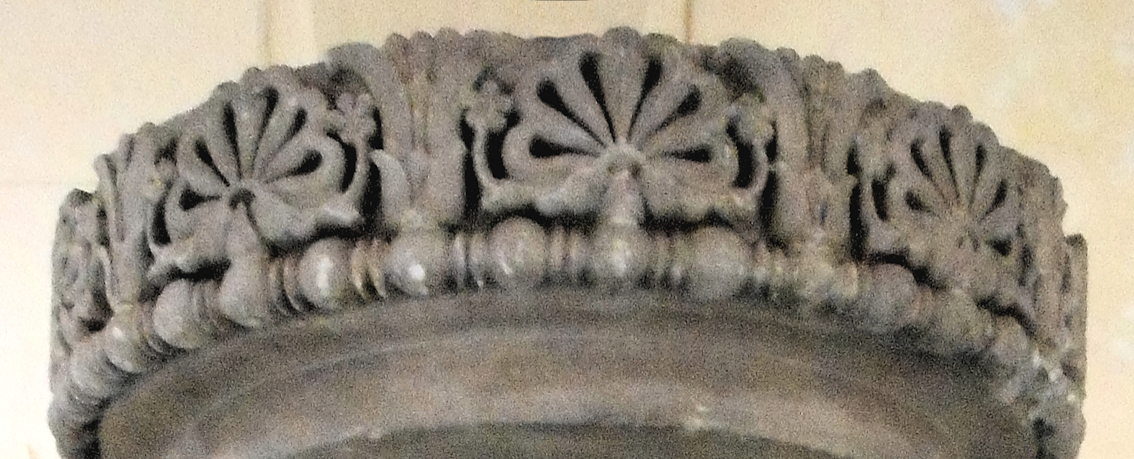
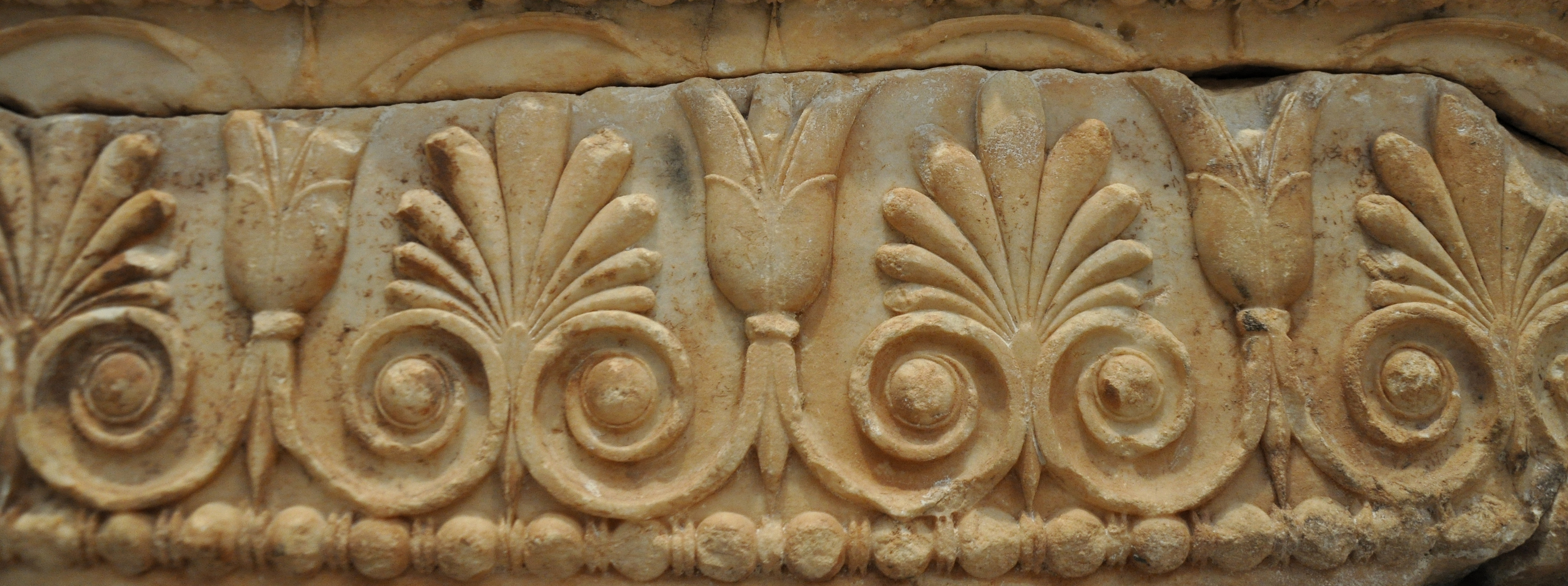
Top image: Abacus of the Allahabad pillar, with lotuses alternating with "flame palmettes" over a bead and reel pattern.
Bottom image: A quite similar frieze from Delphi, 525 BC.

=== Origin ===
==== Western origin ====
There has been much discussion of the extent of influence from Achaemenid Persia, where the column capitals supporting the roofs at Persepolis have similarities, and the "rather cold, hieratic style" of the Sarnath Lion Capital of Ashoka especially shows "obvious Achaemenid and Sargonid influence". India and the Achaemenid Empire had been in close contact since the Achaemenid conquest of the Indus Valley, from c. 500 to 330 BC.

Hellenistic influence has also been suggested. In particular the abaci of some of the pillars (especially the Rampurva bull, the Sankissa elephant and the Allahabad pillar capital) use bands of motifs, like the bead and reel pattern, the ovolo, the flame palmettes, lotuses, which likely originated from Greek and Near-Eastern arts. Such examples can also be seen in the remains of the Mauryan capital city of Pataliputra.

It has also been suggested that 6th century Greek columns such as the Sphinx of Naxos, a 12.5m Ionic column crowned by an animal in the religious centre of Delphi, may have been an inspiration for the pillars of Ashoka. Many similar columns crowned by sphinxes were discovered in ancient Greece, as in Sparta, Athens or Spata, and some were used as funerary steles. The Greek sphinx, a lion with the face of a human female, was considered as having ferocious strength, and was thought of as a guardian, often flanking the entrances to temples or royal tombs.

Pillar as Dhvaja, military standard

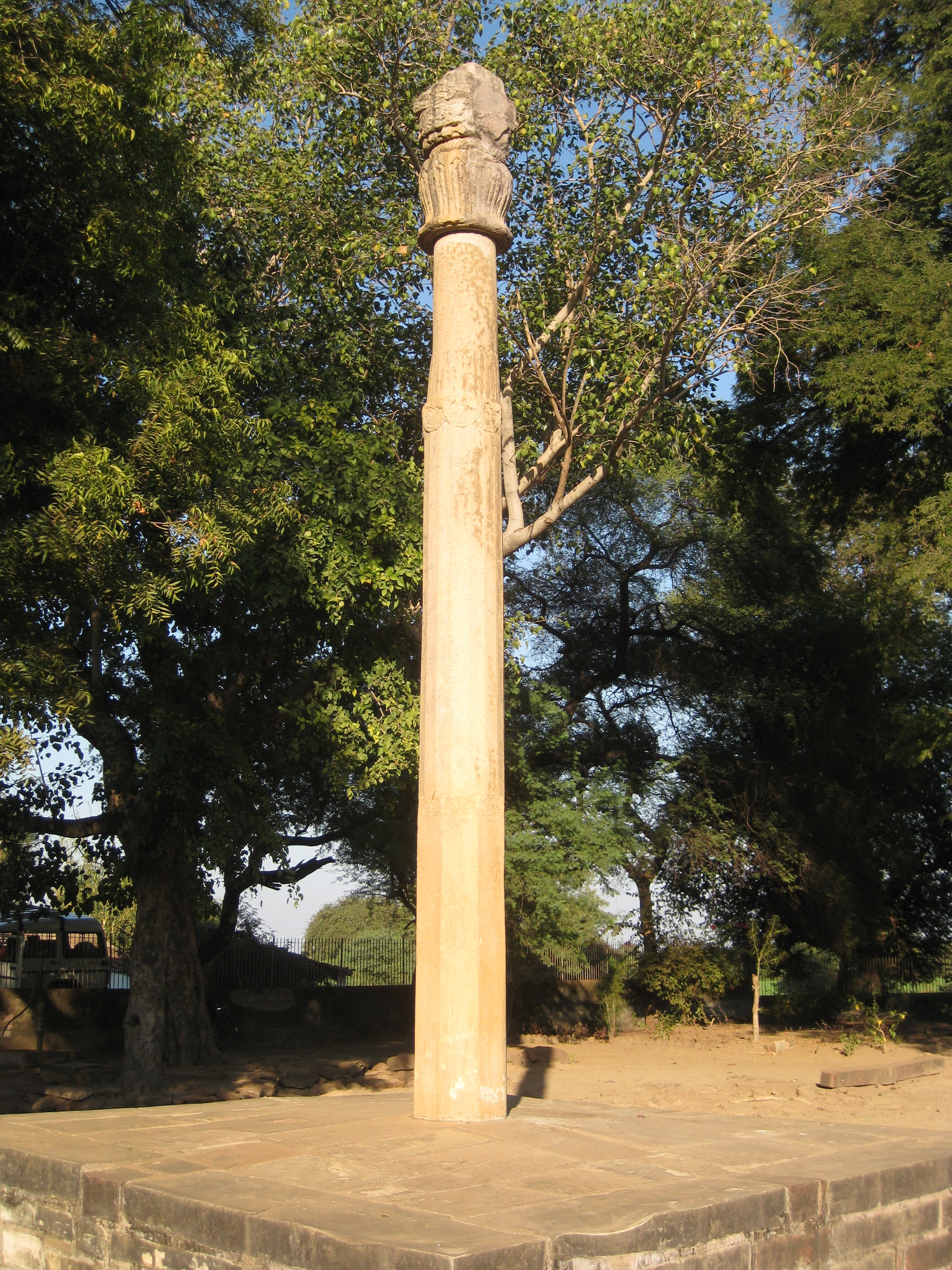
Heliodorus pillar in Vidisha, India, 2nd Century BC

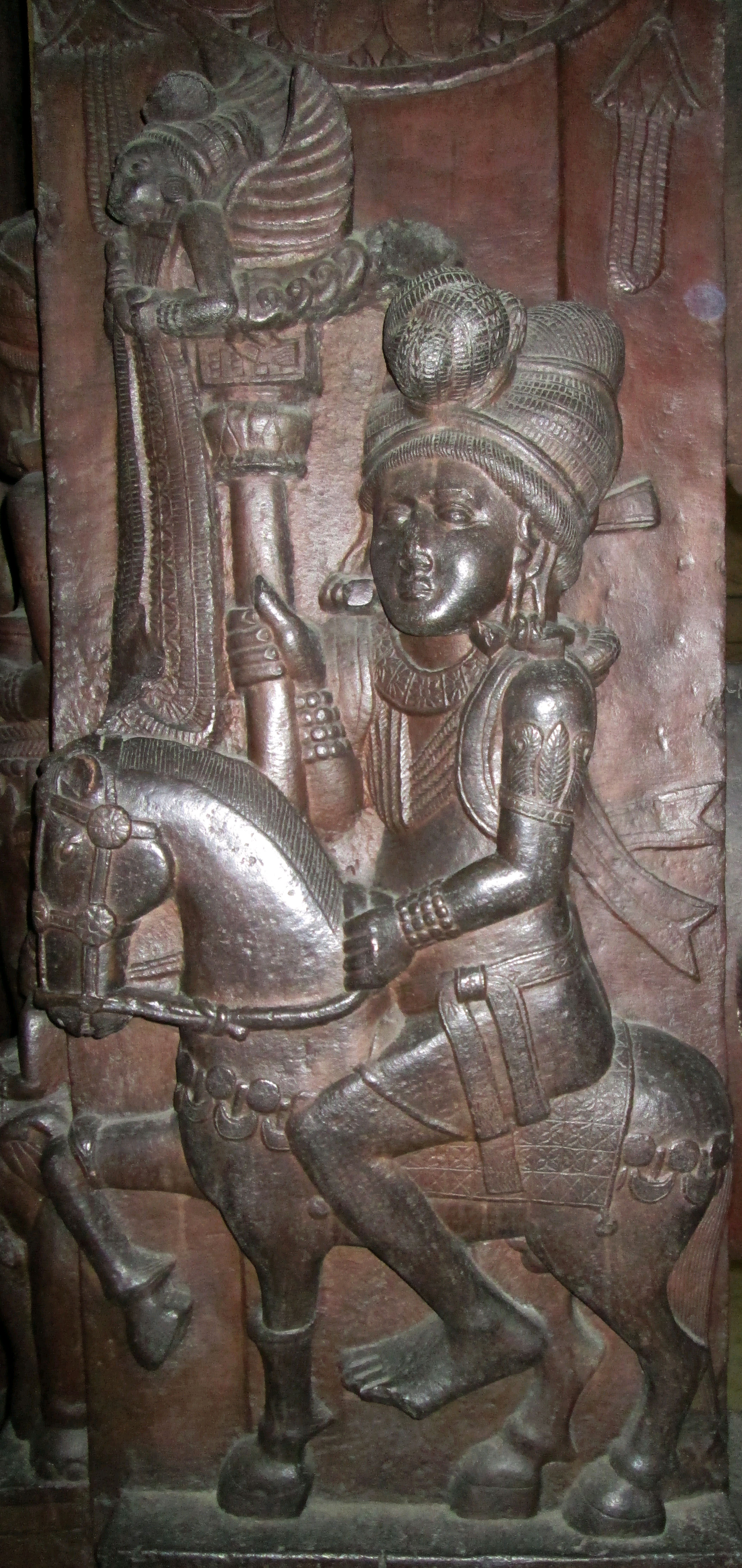
Shunga horseman carrying portable garuda standard, Bharhut 2nd Century BC

==== Indian origin ====
Some scholars such as John Irwin emphasized a reassessment from popular belief of Persian or Greek origin of Ashokan pillars. He makes the argument that Ashokan pillars represent Dhvaja or standard which Indian soldiers carried with them during battle and it was believed that the destruction of the enemy's dhvaja brought misfortune to their opponents. A relief of Bharhut stupa railing portrays a queenly personage on horseback carrying a Garudadhvaja. Heliodorus pillar has been called Garudadhvaja, literally Garuda-standard, the pillar dated to 2nd century BC is perhaps the earliest recorded stone pillar which has been declared a dhvaja.

Ashokan edicts themselves state that his words should be carved on any stone slab or pillars available indicating that the tradition of carving stone pillars was present before the period of Ashoka.

John Irwin also highlights the fact that carvings on pillars such as Allahabad pillar was done when it had already been erected indicating its pre Ashokan origins.

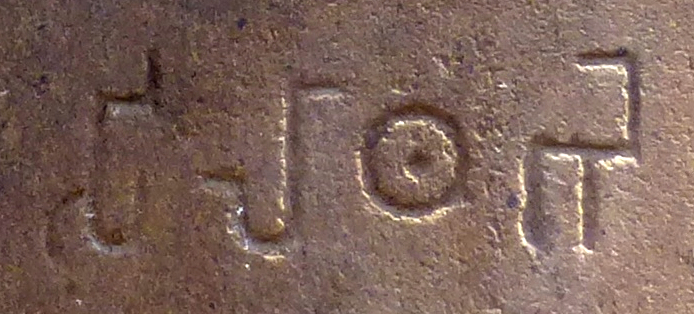
Ashoka called his own pillars Silā Thabhe (𑀲𑀺𑀮𑀸𑀣𑀪𑁂, Stone Stambha, i.e. stone pillars). Lumbini inscription, Brahmi script.

==== Stylistic argument ====
Though influence from the west is generally accepted, especially the Persian columns of Achaemenid Persia, there are a number of differences between these and the pillars. Persian columns are built in segments whereas Ashokan pillars are monoliths, like some much later Roman columns. Most of the Persian pillars have a fluted shaft while the Mauryan pillars are smooth, and Persian pillars serve as supporting structures whereas Ashokan pillars are individual free-standing monuments. There are also other differences in the decoration. Indian historian Upinder Singh comments on some of the differences and similarities, writing that "If the Ashokan pillars cannot in their entirety be attributed to Persian influence, they must have had an undocumented prehistory within the subcontinent, perhaps a tradition of wooden carving. But the transition from stone to wood was made in one magnificent leap, no doubt spurred by the imperial tastes and ambitions of the Maurya emperors."

Whatever the cultural and artistic borrowings from the west, the pillars of Ashoka, together with much of Mauryan art and architectural prowesses such as the city of Pataliputra or the Barabar Caves, remain outstanding in their achievements, and often compare favourably with the rest of the world at that time. Commenting on Mauryan sculpture, John Marshall once wrote about the "extraordinary precision and accuracy which characterizes all Mauryan works, and which has never, we venture to say, been surpassed even by the finest workmanship on Athenian buildings".

== Complete list of the pillars ==
Five of the pillars of Ashoka, two at Rampurva, one each at Vaishali, Lauriya Araraj and Lauria Nandangarh possibly marked the course of the ancient Royal highway from Pataliputra to Nepal. Several pillars were relocated by later Mughal Empire rulers, the animal capitals being removed.

The two Chinese medieval pilgrim accounts record sightings of several columns that have now vanished: Faxian records six and Xuanzang fifteen, of which only five at most can be identified with surviving pillars. All surviving pillars, listed with any crowning animal sculptures and the edicts inscribed, are as follows:

=== Complete standing pillars, or pillars with Ashokan inscriptions ===
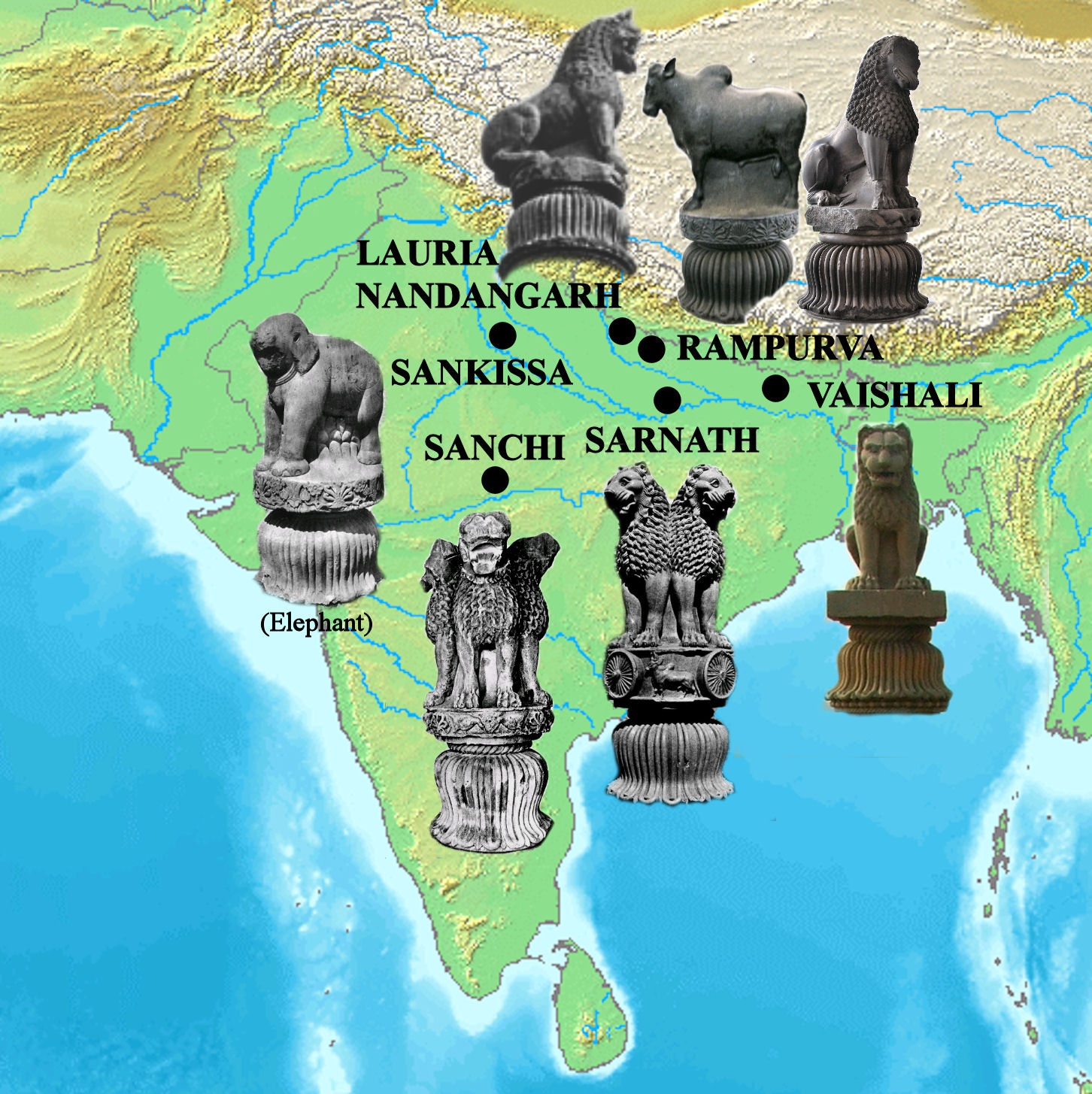
Geographical spread of known pillar capitals.

- Delhi-Topra pillar, in the fortress of Feroz Shah Kotla, Delhi (Pillar Edicts I, II, III, IV, V, VI, VII); moved in AD 1356 from Topra Kalan in Yamunanagar district of Haryana to Delhi by Firuz Shah Tughluq.
- Delhi-Meerut, Delhi ridge, Delhi (Pillar Edicts I, II, III, IV, V, VI); moved from Meerut to Delhi by Firuz Shah Tughluq in 1356.
- Nigali Sagar (or Nigliva, Nigalihawa), near Lumbini, Nepal. Pillar missing capital, one Ashoka edict. Erected in the 20th regnal year of Ashoka (c. 249 BC).
- Rupandehi, near Lumbini, Nepal. Also erected in the 20th regnal year of Ashoka (c. 249 BC), to commemorate Ashoka's pilgrimage to Lumbini. Capital missing, but was apparently a horse.
- Allahabad pillar, Uttar Pradesh (originally located at Kausambi and probably moved to Allahabad by Jahangir; Pillar Edicts I-VI, Queen's Edict, Schism Edict).
- Rampurva, Champaran, Bihar. Two columns: a lion with Pillar Edicts I, II, III, IV, V, VI; a bull without inscriptions. The abacus of the bull capital features honeysuckle and palmette designs derived from Greek designs.
- Sanchi, near Bhopal, Madhya Pradesh, four lions, Schism Edict.
- Sarnath, near Varanasi, Uttar Pradesh, four lions, Pillar Inscription, Schism Edict. This is the famous "Lion Capital of Ashoka" used in the national emblem of India.
- Lauriya-Nandangarth, Champaran, Bihar, single lion, Pillar Edicts I, II, III, IV, V, VI.
- Lauriya Araraj, Champaran, Bihar (Pillar Edicts I, II, III, IV, V, VI).
- Vaishali, Bihar, single lion, with no inscription.

The Amaravati Pillar fragment is rather problematic. It consists of only six lines in Brahmi which are hardly decipherable. Only the word vijaya (victory) can be made out, arguably a word also used by Ashoka. Sircar, who provides a detailed study, considers it as probably belonging to an Ashokan pillar.

Complete standing pillars, or pillars with Ashokan inscriptions
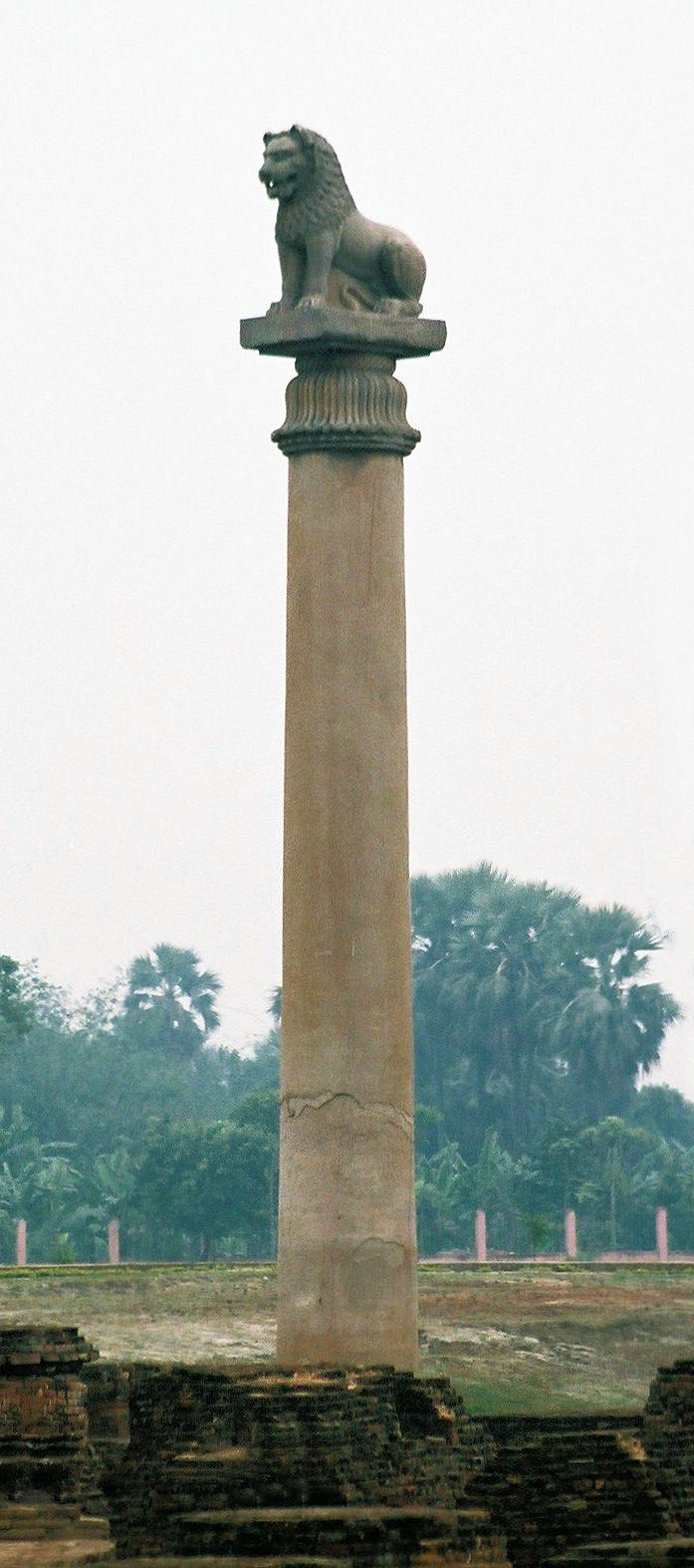
Vaishali

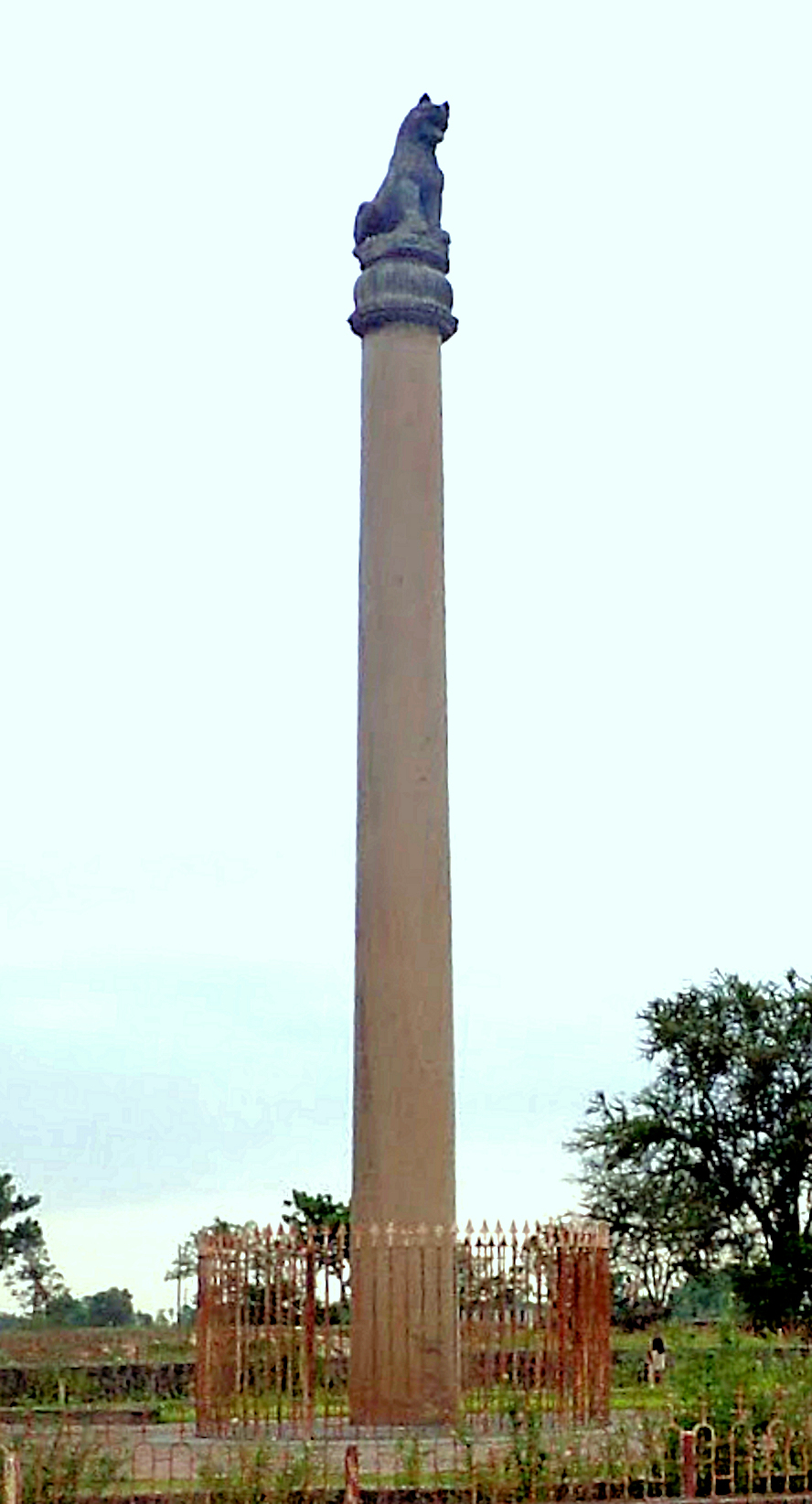
Lauriya-Nandangarh

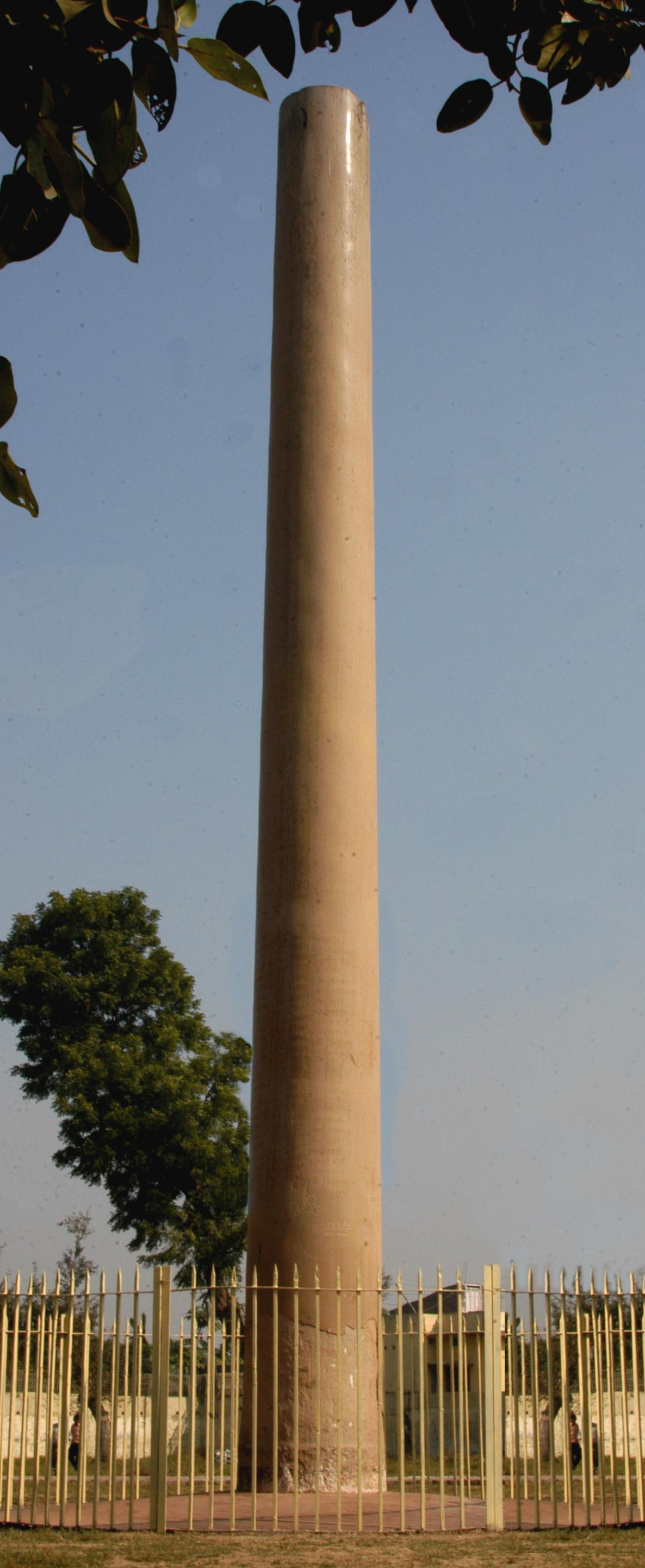
Lauriya-Araraj

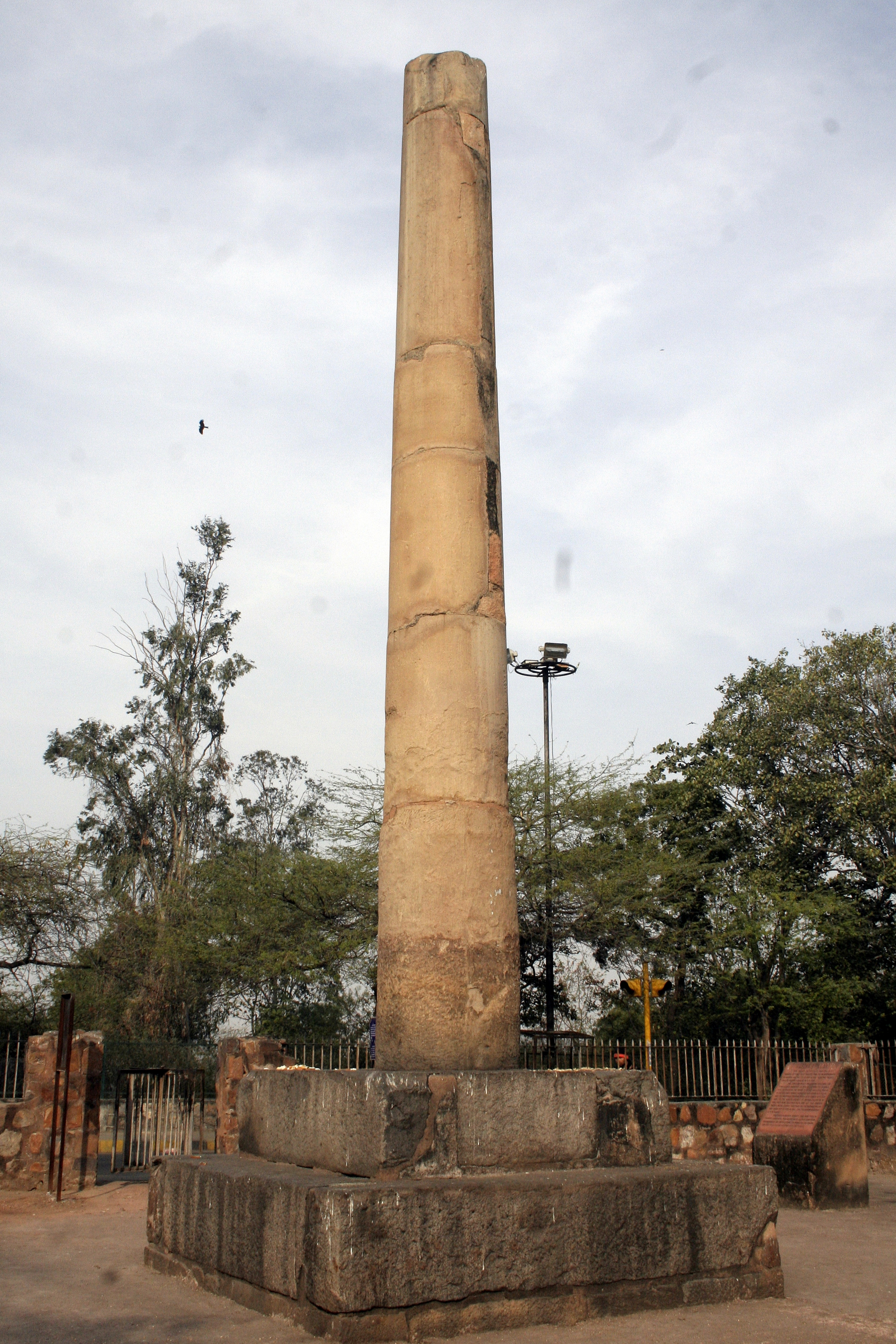
Delhi-Meerut (originally from Meerut, broken in pieces during transportation).

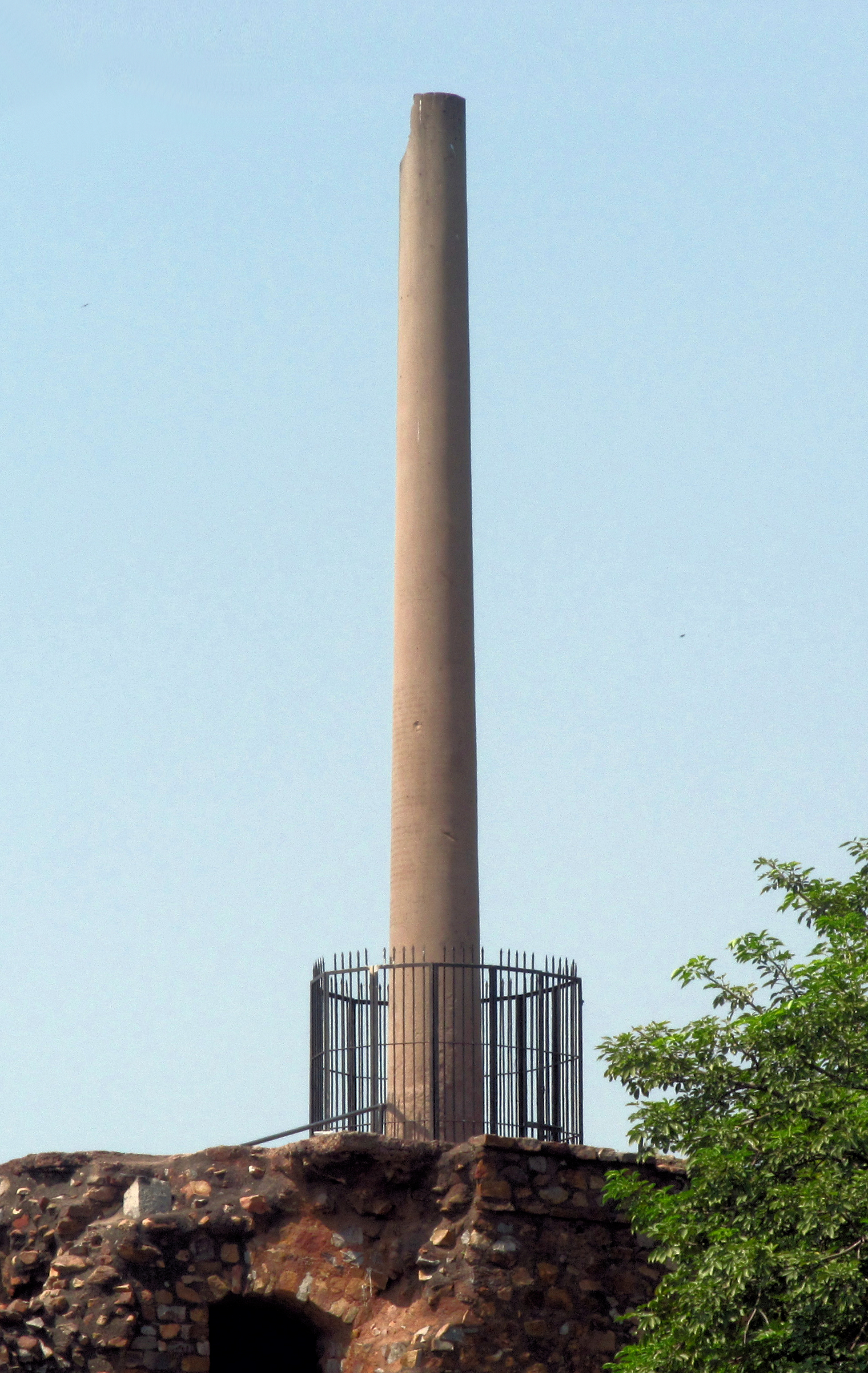
Delhi-Topra (originally from Topra Kalan).

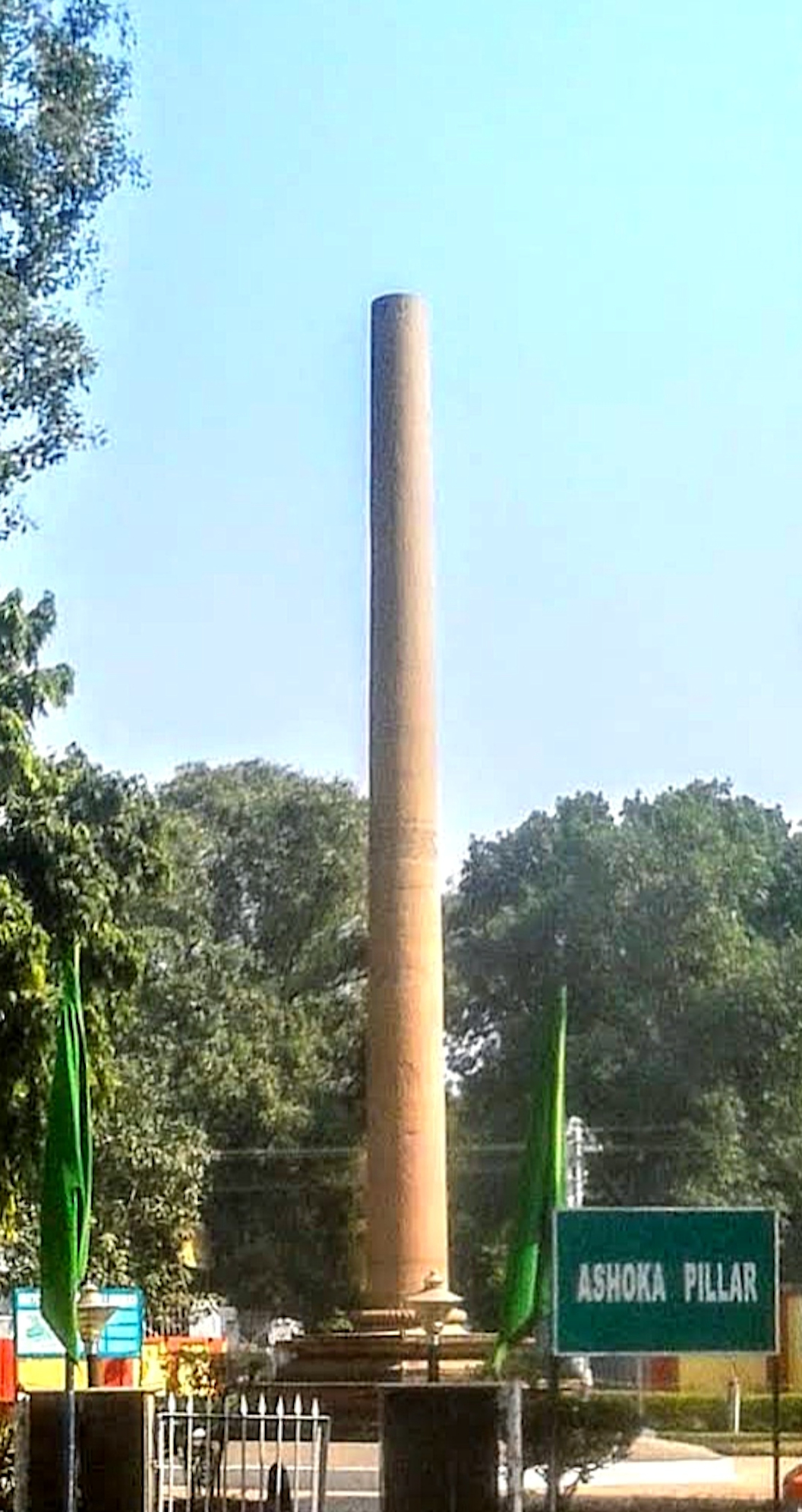
Allahabad (originally from Kosambi)

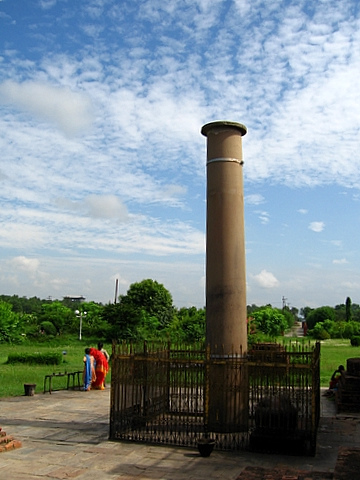
Lumbini, Nepal (broken in half). Capped for protection in the 20th century.
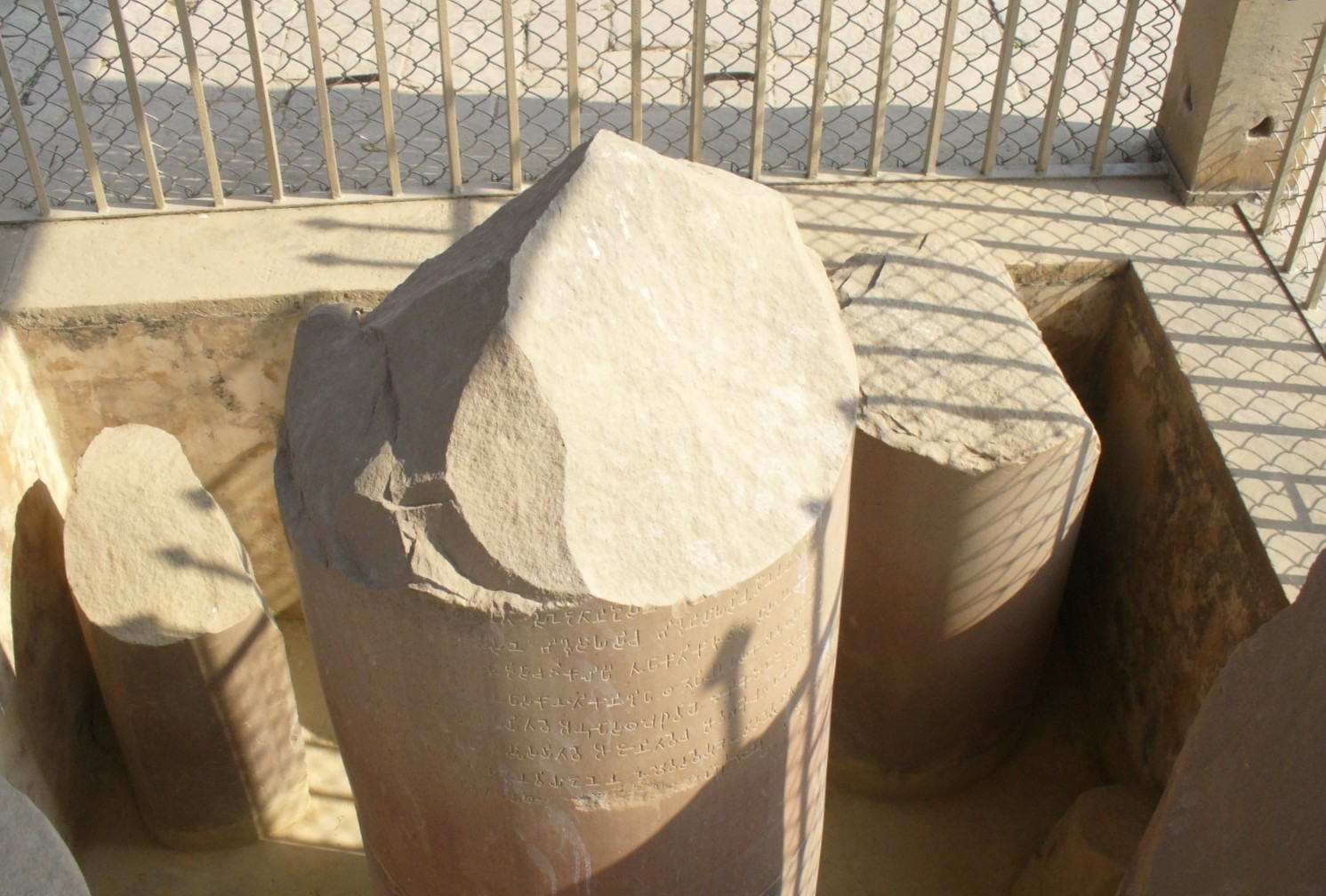
Sarnath

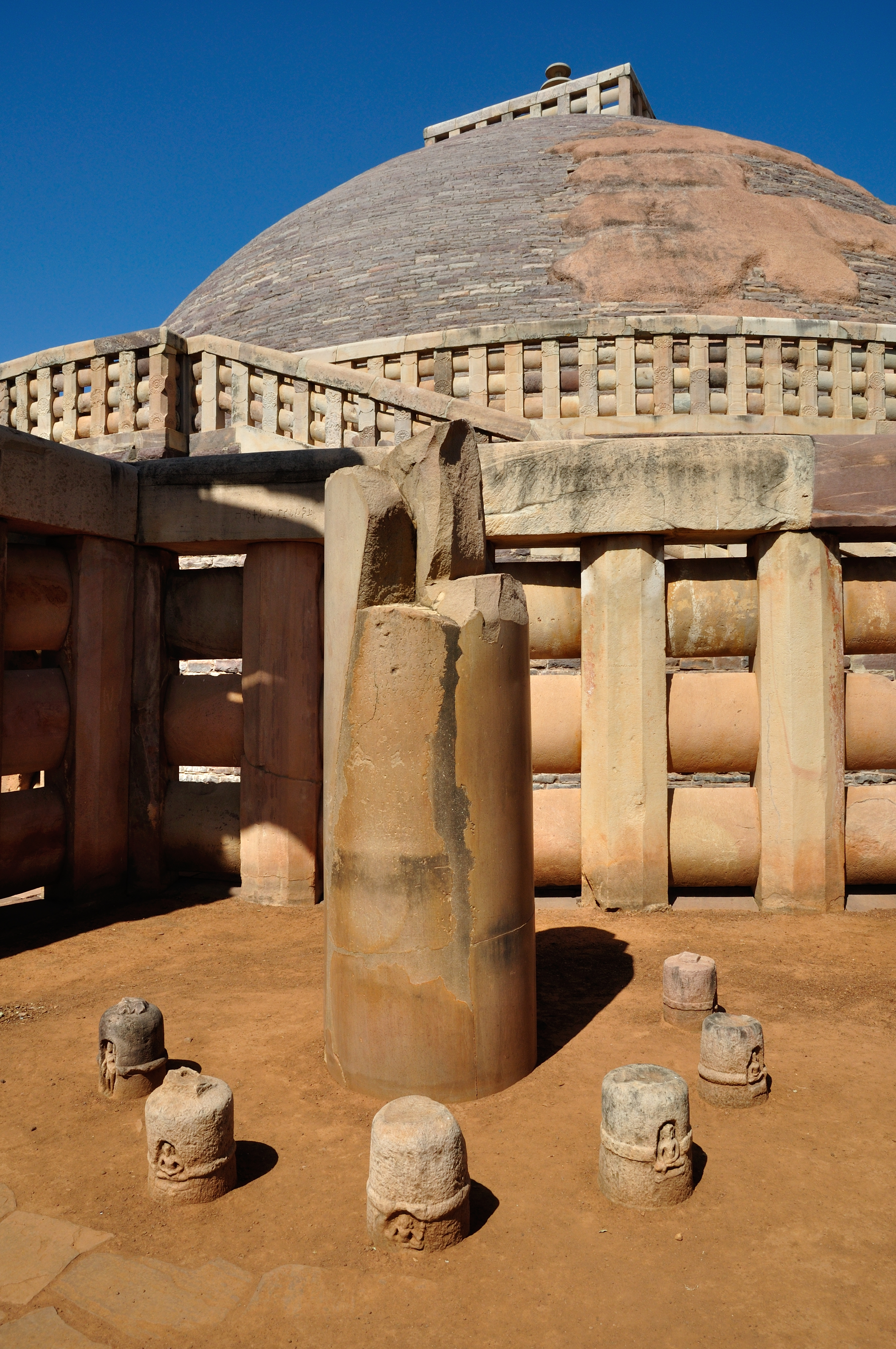
Sanchi

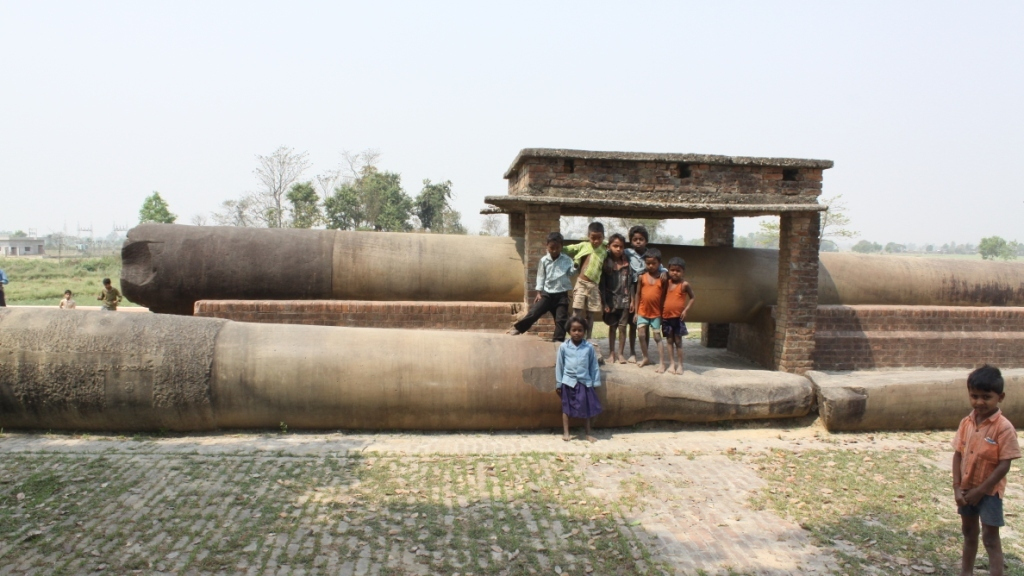
Rampurva

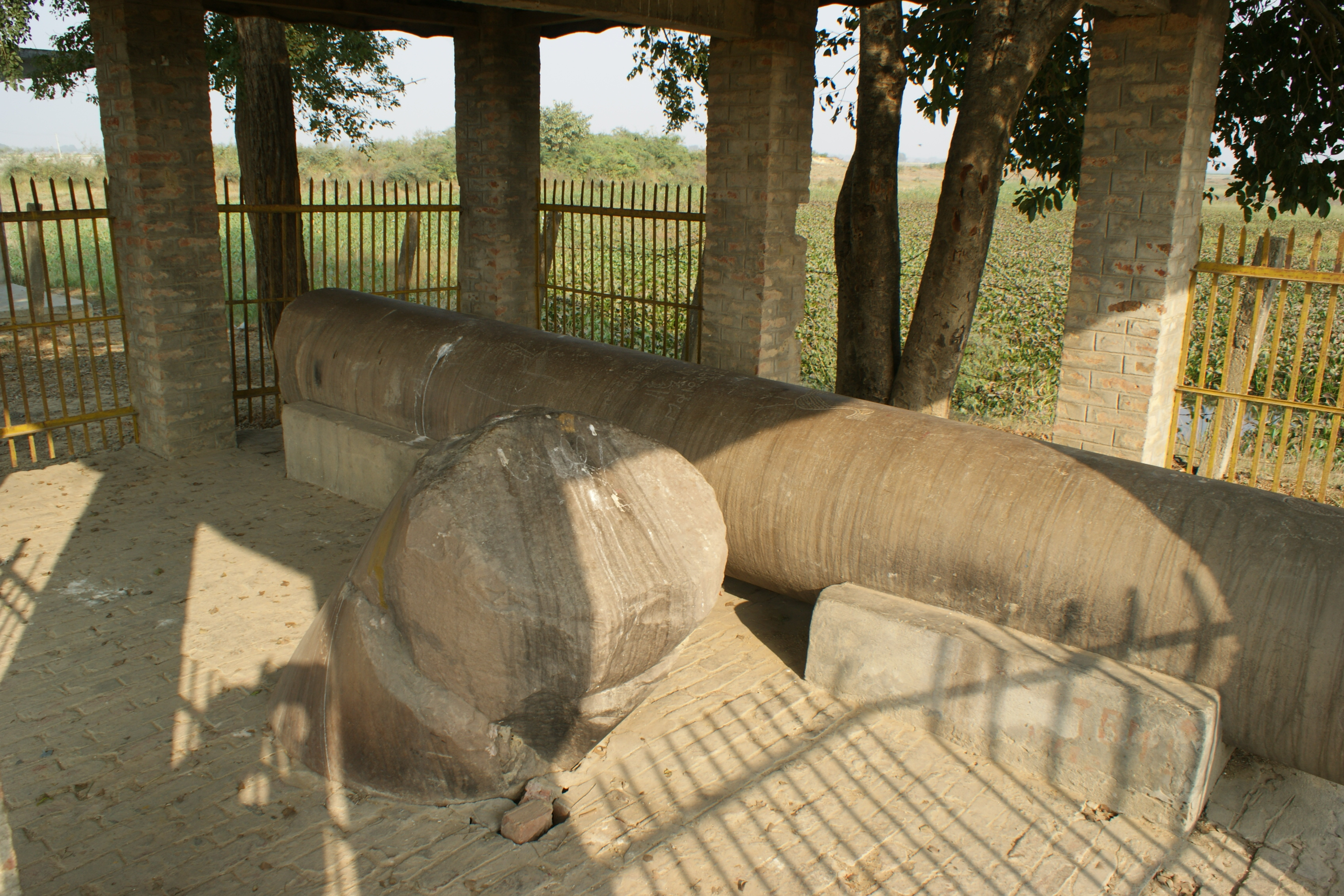
Nigali Sagar

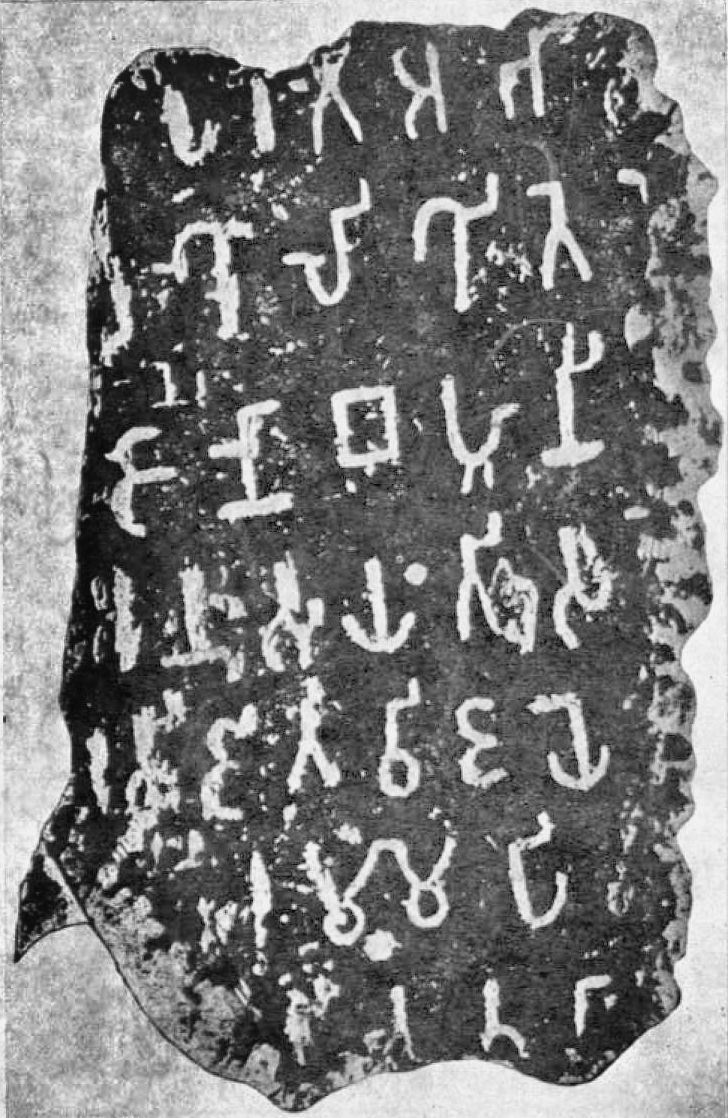
Fragment of pillar with inscription, Amaravati.

=== Pillars without Ashokan inscriptions ===
There are also several known fragments of Ashokan pillars, without recovered Ashokan inscriptions, such as the pillars in Bodh Gaya, Kausambi, Gotihawa, Prahladpur (now in the Government Sanskrit College, Varanasi), Fatehabad, Bhopal, Sadagarli, Udaigiri-Vidisha, Kushinagar, Arrah (Masarh), Basti, Bhikana Pahari, Bulandi Bagh (Pataliputra), Sandalpu and a few others, as well as a broken pillar in Bhairon ("Lat Bhairo" in Benares) which was destroyed to a stump by Muslims during Hindu-Muslim riots in 1809. The Chinese monks Fa-Hsien and Hsuantsang also reported pillars in Kushinagar, the Jetavana monastery in Sravasti, Rajagriha and Mahasala, which have not been recovered to this day.

Fragments of Pillars of Ashoka, without Ashokan inscriptions
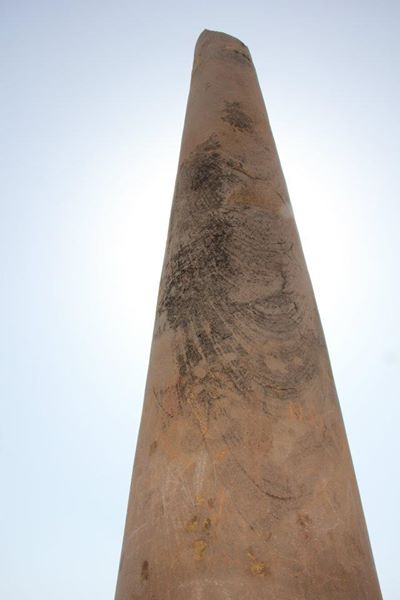
Kausambi

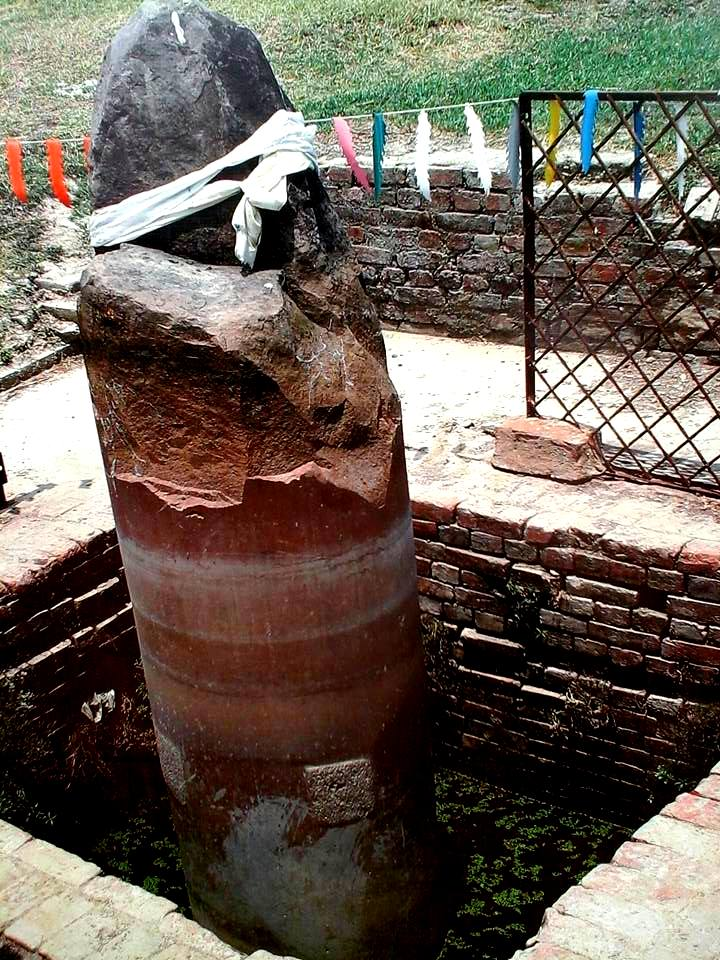
Gotihawa, Nepal, possible base of the Nigali Sagar pillar

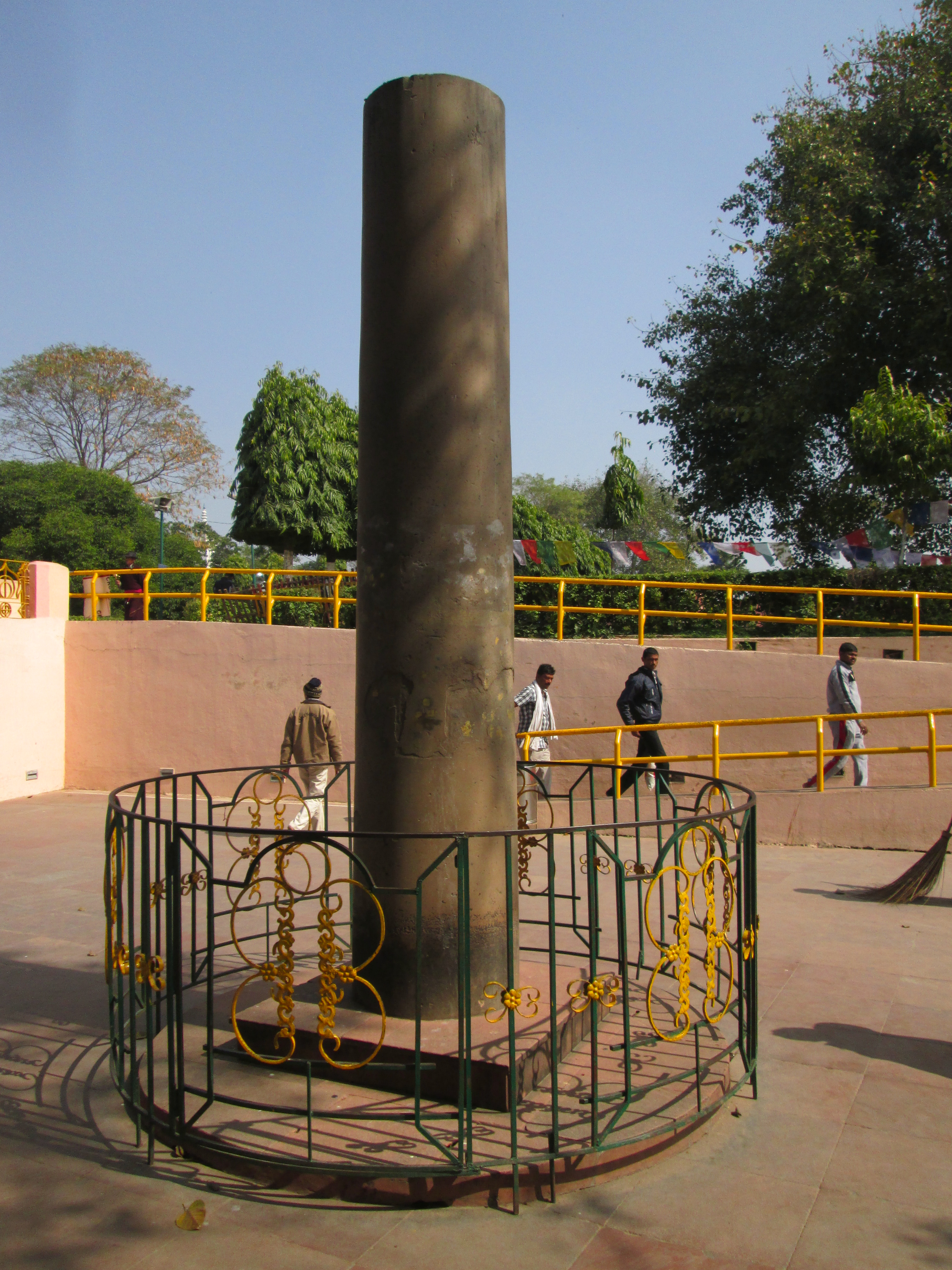
Bodh Gaya (originally near Sujata Stupa, brought from Gaya in 1956).

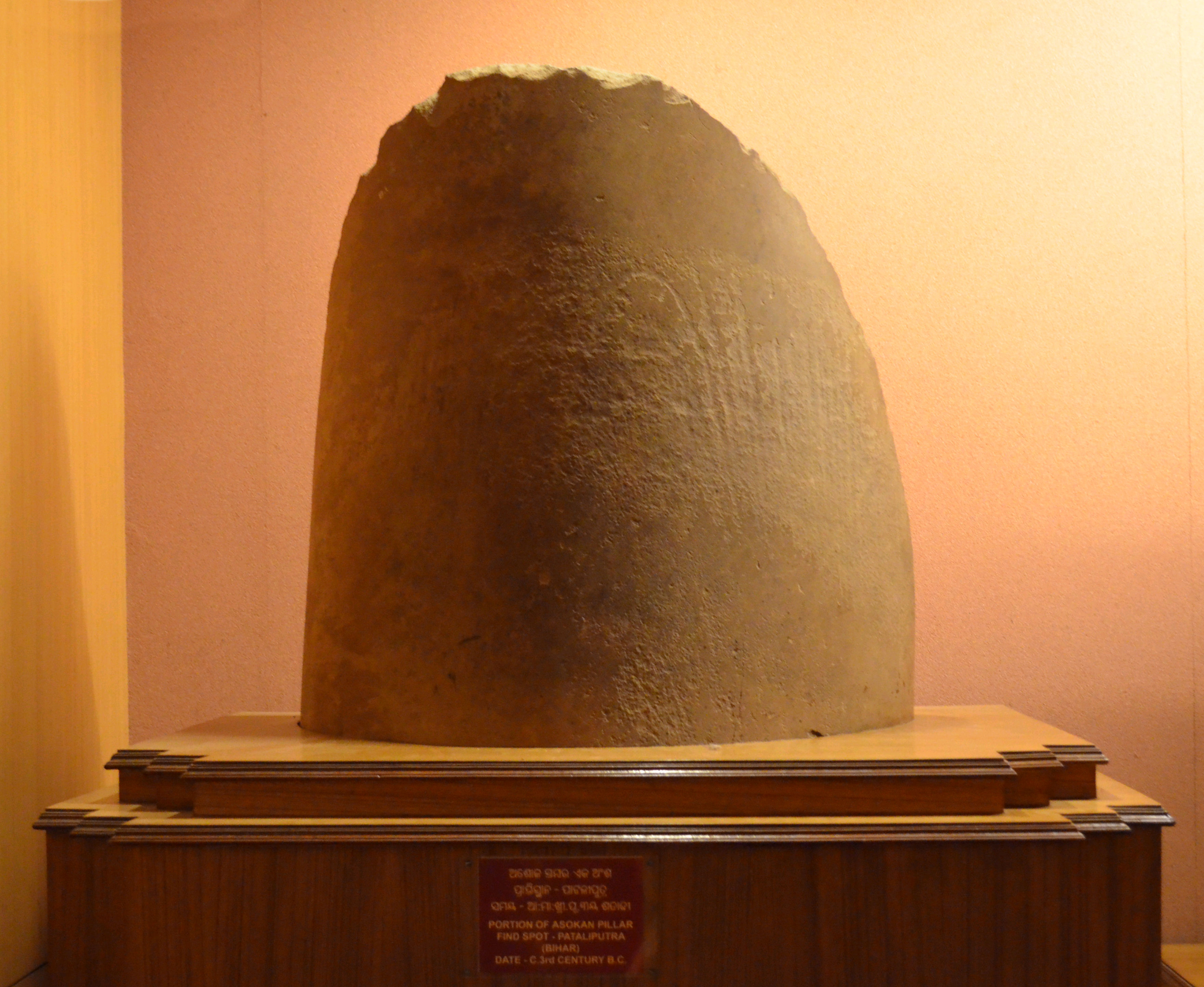
Portion of an Ashokan pillar, found in Pataliputra.

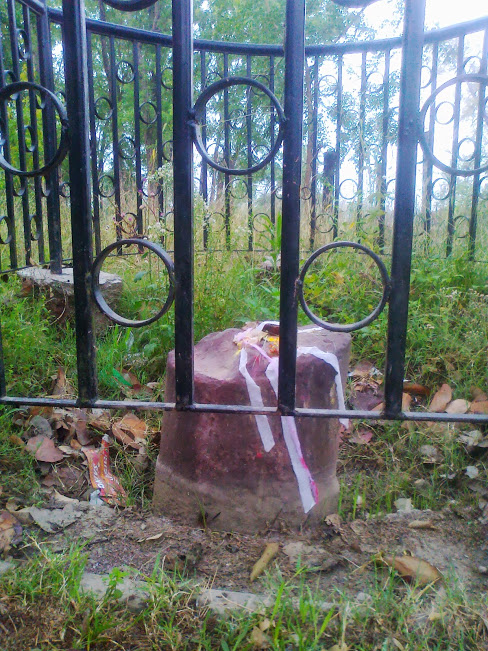
Bhawanipur Rupandehi, Nepal.

== Capitals ==
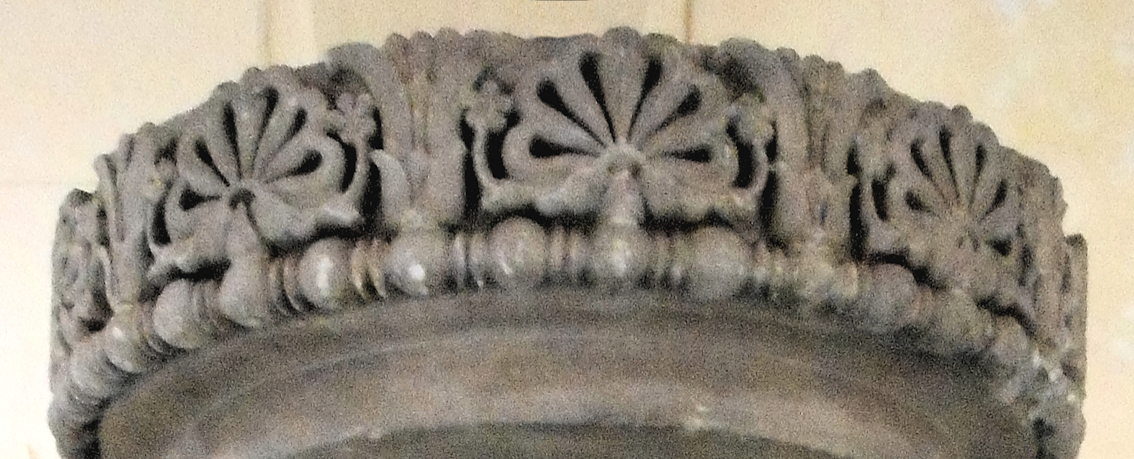
Abacus of the Allahabad Pillar of Ashoka, the only remaining portion of the capital of the Allahabad Pillar.

There are altogether seven remaining complete capitals, five with lions, one with an elephant and one with a zebu bull. One of them, the four lions of Sarnath, has become the State Emblem of India. The animal capitals are composed of a lotiform base, with an abacus decorated with floral, symbolic or animal designs, topped by the realistic depiction of an animal, thought to each represent a traditional directions in India.

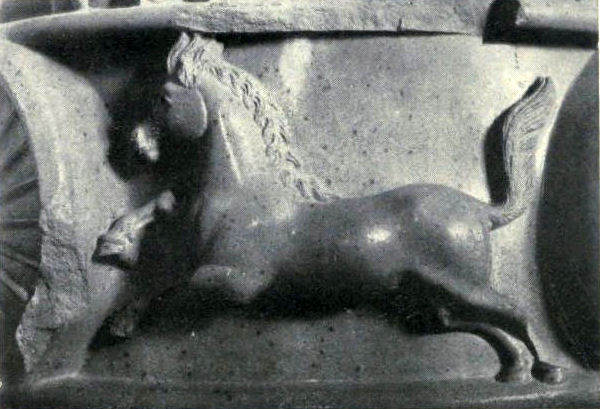
The horse motif on the Sarnath Lion Capital of Ashoka, is often described as an example of Hellenistic realism.

Various foreign influences have been described in the design of these capitals. The animal on top of a lotiform capital reminds of Achaemenid column shapes. The abacus also often seems to display some influence of Greek art: in the case of the Rampurva bull or the Sankassa elephant, it is composed of honeysuckles alternated with stylized palmettes and small rosettes. A similar kind of design can be seen in the frieze of the lost capital of the Allahabad Pillar. These designs likely originated in Greek and Near-Eastern arts. They would probably have come from the neighboring Seleucid Empire, and specifically from a Hellenistic city such as Ai-Khanoum, located at the doorstep of India. Most of these designs and motifs can also be seen in the Pataliputra capital.

The Diamond throne of Bodh Gaya is another example of Ashokan architecture circa 260 BC, and displays a band of carvings with palmettes and geese, similar to those found on several of the Pillars of Ashoka.

Chronological order

Based on stylistic and technical analysis, it is possible to establish a tentative chronological orders for the pillars. The earliest one seems to be the Vaishali pillar, with its stout and short column, the rigid lion and the undecorated square abacus. Next would follow the Sankissa elephant and the Rampurva bull, also not yet benefiting from Mauryan polish, and using a Hellenistic abacus of lotus and palmettes for decoration. The abacus would then adopt the Hamsa goose as an animal decorative symbol, in Lauria Nandangarh and the Rampurva lion. Sanchi and Sarnath would mark the culmination with four animals back-to-back instead of just one, and a new and sophisticated animal and symbolic abacus (the elephant, the bull, the lion, the horse alternating with the Dharma wheel) for the Sarnath lion.

Other chronological orders have also been proposed, for example based on the style of the Ashokan inscriptions on the pillars, since the stylistically most sophisticated pillars actually have the engravings of the Edicts of Ashoka of the worst quality, namely, very poorly engraved Schism Edicts on the Sanchi and Sarnath pillars, their only inscriptions. This approach offers an almost reverse chronological order to the preceding one. According to Irwin, the Sankissa elephant and Rampurva bull pillars with their Hellenistic abacus are pre-Ashokan. Ashoka would then have commissioned the Sarnath pillar with its famous Lion Capital of Ashoka to be built under the tutelage of craftsmen from the former Achaemenid Empire, trained in Perso-Hellenistic statuary, whereas the Brahmi engraving on the very same pillar (and on pillars of the same period such as Sanchi and Kosambi-Allahabad) was made by inexperienced Indian engravers at a time when stone engraving was still new in India. After Ashoka sent back the foreign artists, style degraded over a short period of time, down to the time when the Major Pillar Edicts were engraved at the end of Ashoka's reign, which now displayed very good inscriptional craftsmanship but a much more solemn and less elegant style for the associated lion capitals, as for the Lauria Nandangarh lion and the Rampurva lion.

Known capitals of the pillars of Ashoka
Ordered chronologically based on stylistic and technical analysis.
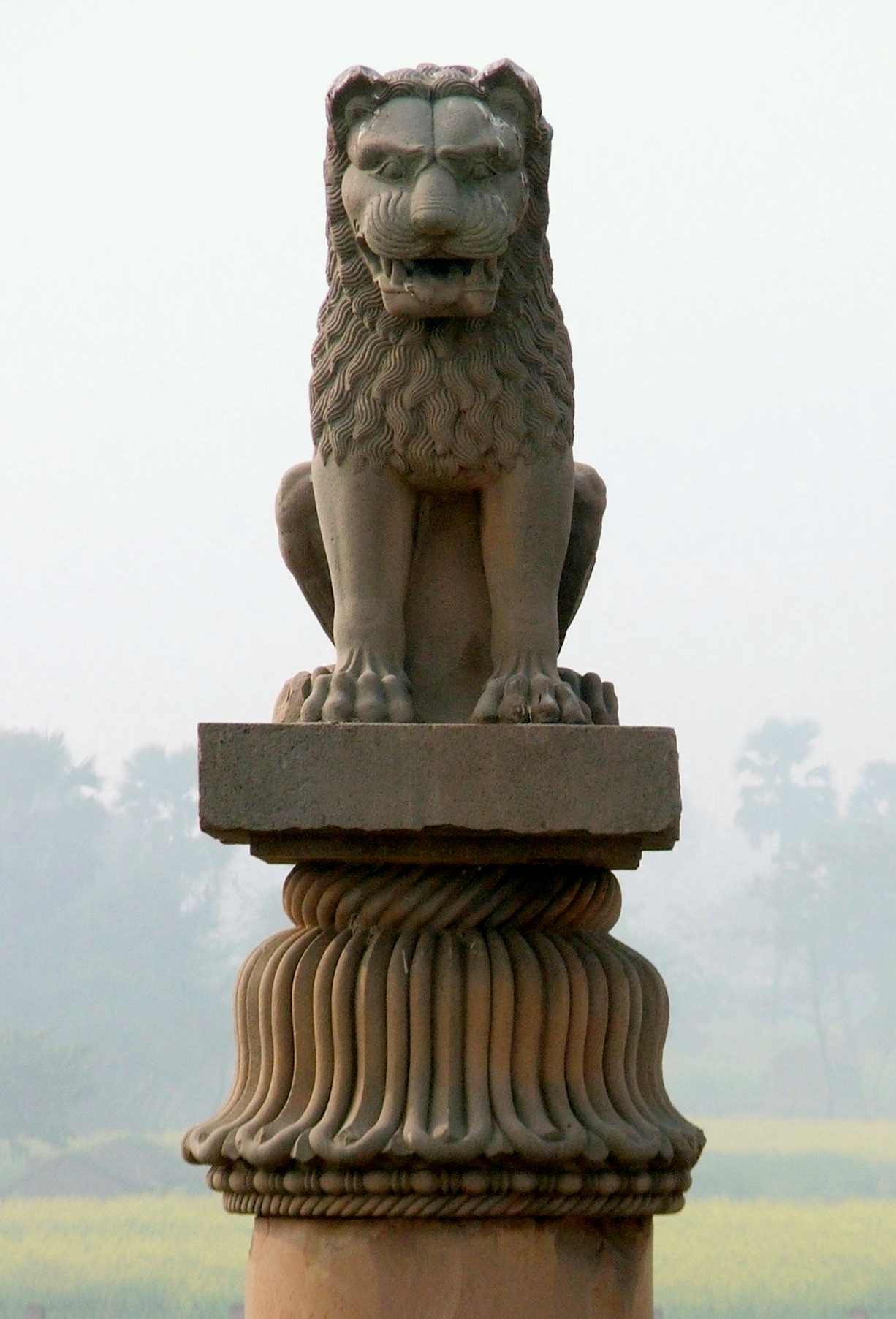
Vaishali lion

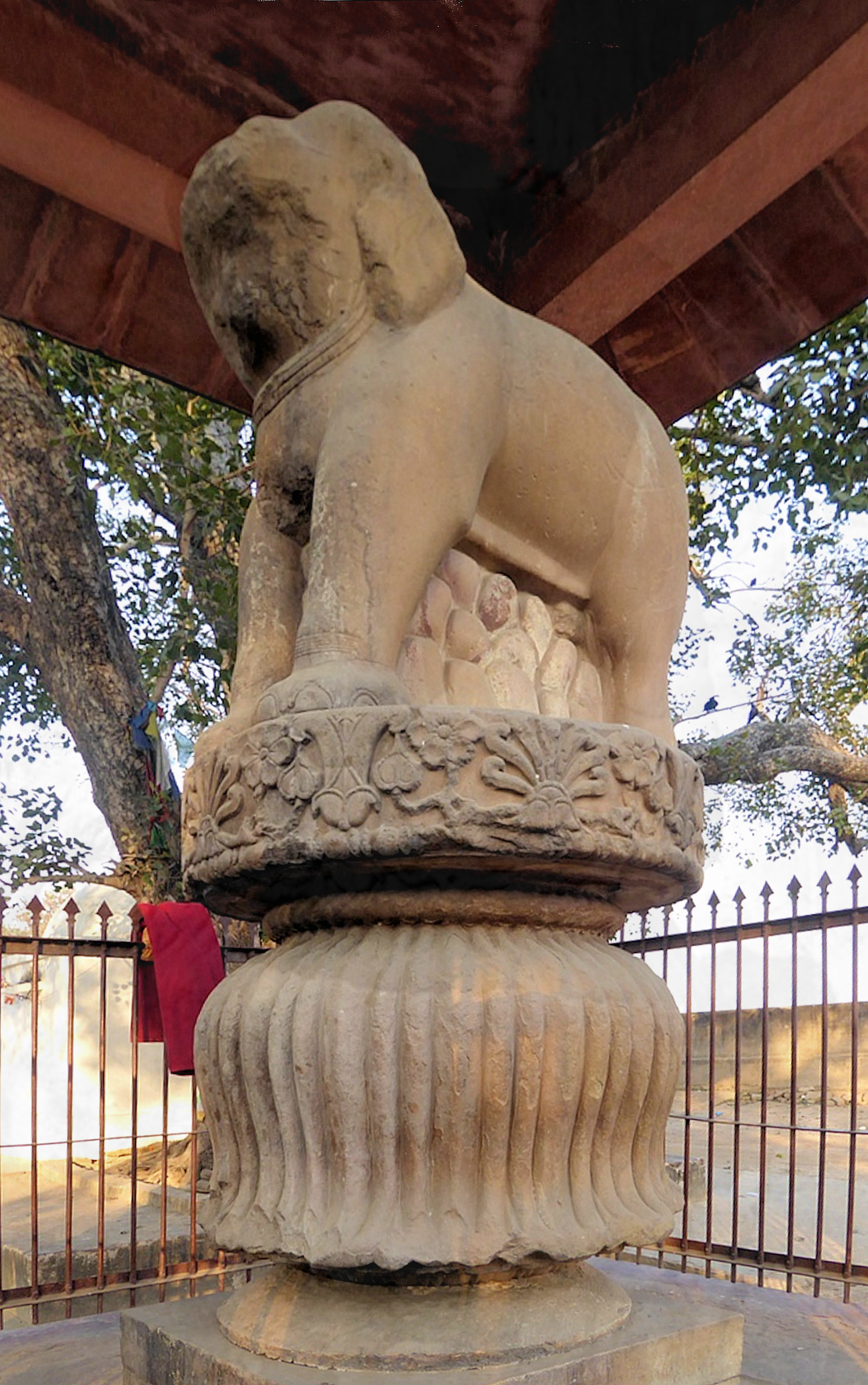
Sankissa elephant.

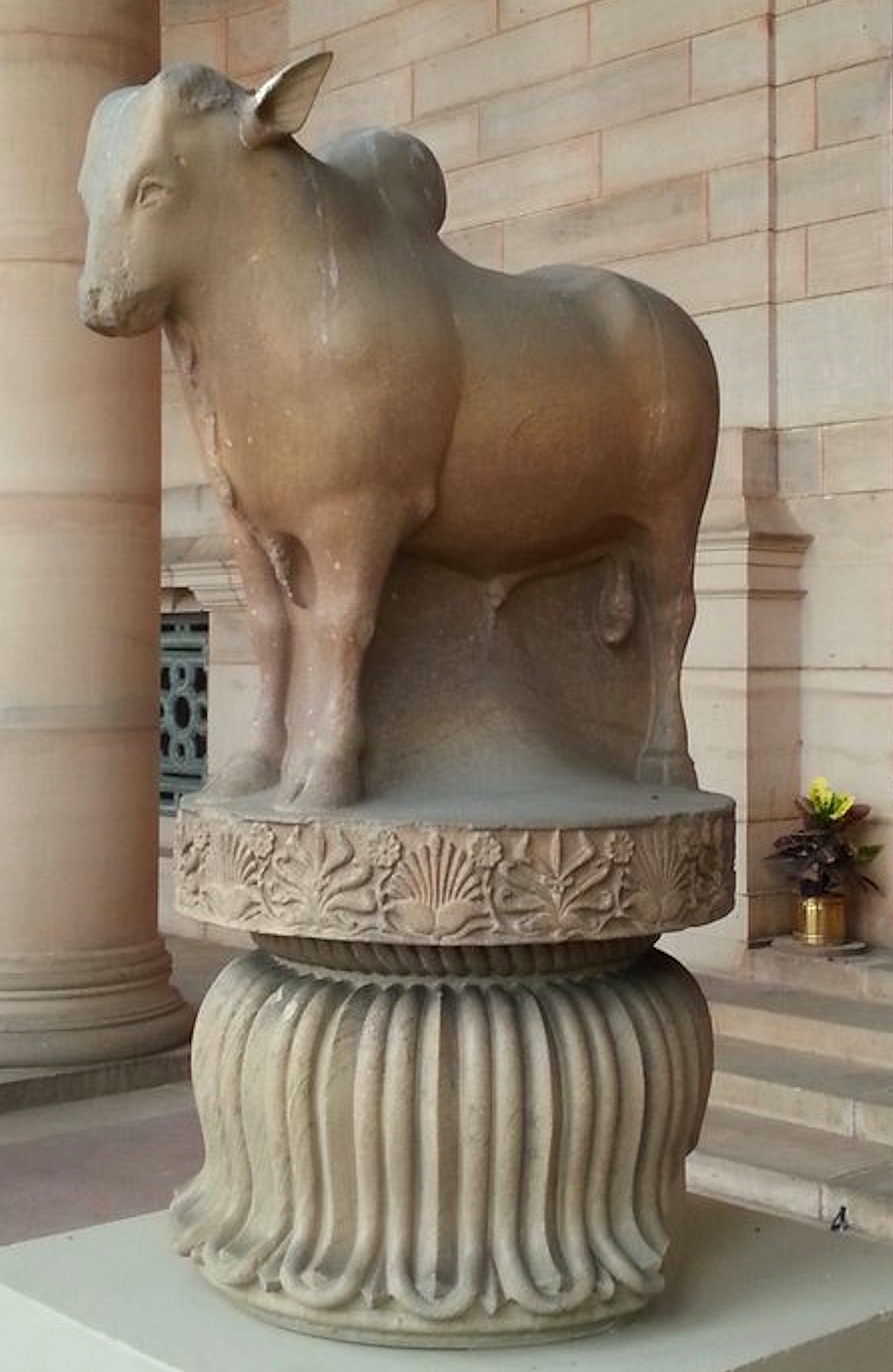
Rampurva zebu bull original (now in Rashtrapati Bhavan, New Delhi).

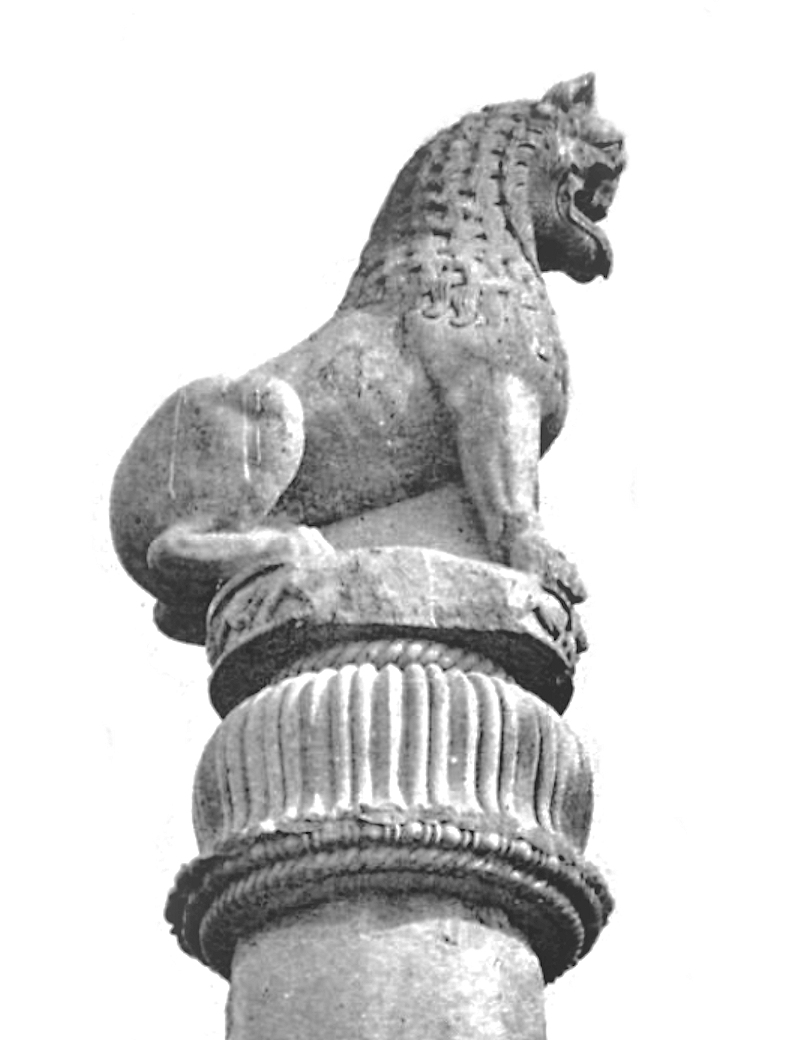
Lauria Nandangarh lion.

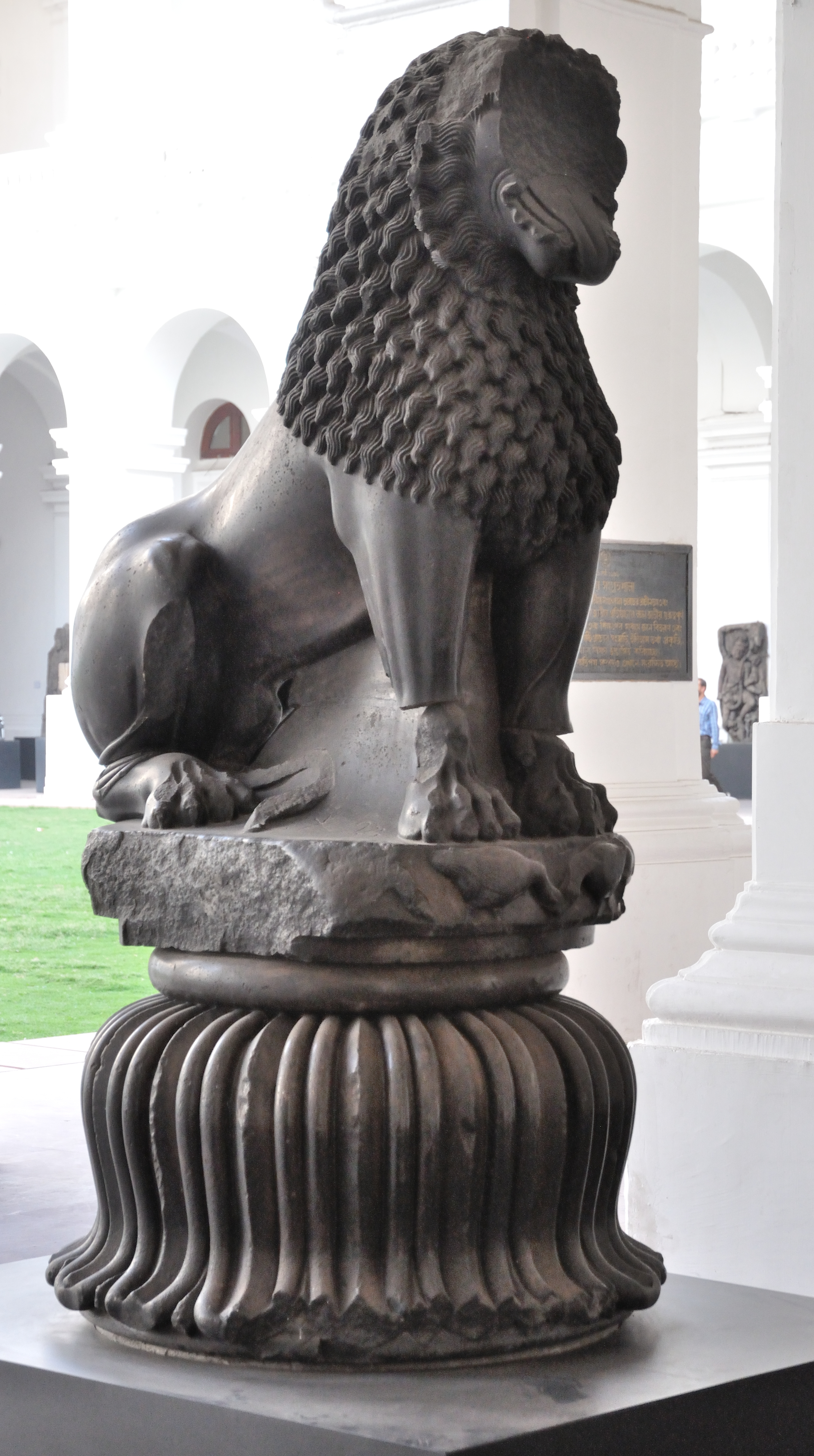
Rampurva lion.

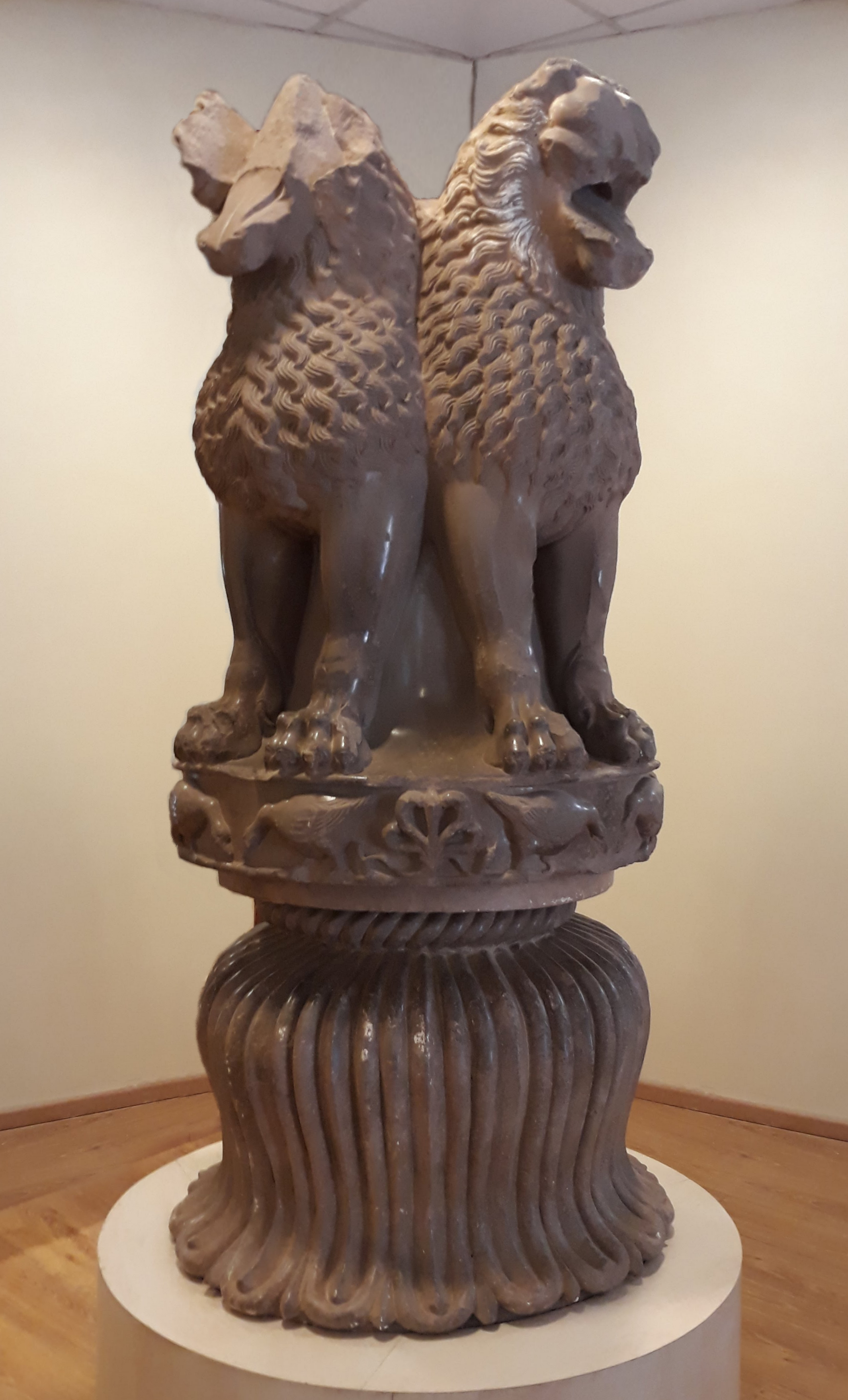
Four lions, once possibly crowned by a wheel, from Sanchi.

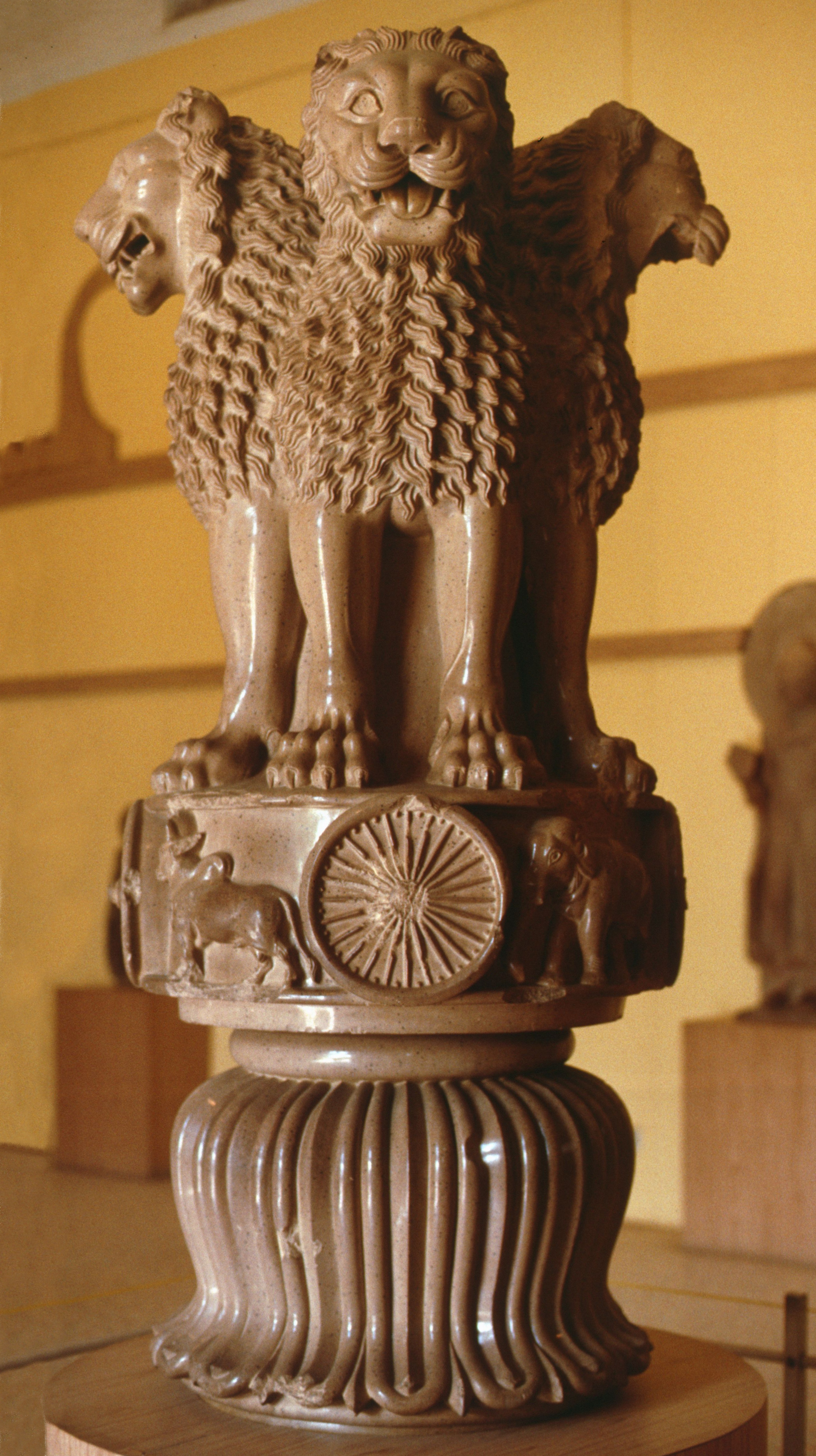
The "Lion Capital of Ashoka", from Sarnath.

Of the Allahabad Pillar, only the abacus remains, the bottom bulb and the crowning animal having been lost. The remains are now located in the Allahabad Museum.

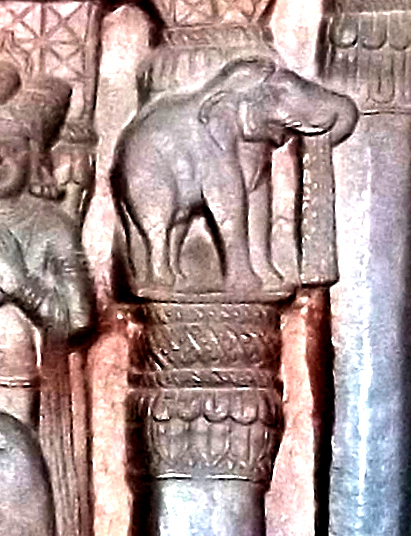
The elephant-crowned pillar of Ashoka at the Mahabodhi Temple, Gaya. Bharhut relief, 100 BC.

A few more possibly Ashokan capitals were also found without their pillars:

- Kesariya (capital). Only the capital was found in the Kesaria stupa. It was discovered by Markham Kittoe in 1862, and said to be similar to the lion of the Lauriya Nandangarh pillar, except for the hind legs of the lion, which did not protrude beyond the abacus. This capital is now lost.
- Udaigiri-Vidisha (capital only at the Udayagiri Caves, visible here). Attribution to Ashoka however is disputed (ranging from the 2nd century BC Sunga period, to the Gupta period.).

It is also known from various ancient sculptures (reliefs from Bharhut, 100 BC), and later narrative account by Chinese pilgrims (5-6th century AD), that there was a pillar of Ashoka at the Mahabodhi Temple founded by Ashoka, that it was crowned by an elephant.

The same Chinese pilgrims have reported that the capital of the Lumbini pillar was a horse (now lost), which, by their time had already fallen to the ground.

== Inscriptions ==
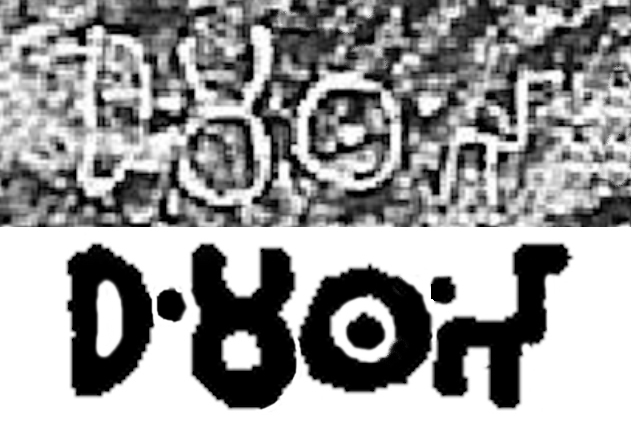
Ashoka also called his pillars "Dhaṃma thaṃbhā" (𑀥𑀁𑀫𑀣𑀁𑀪𑀸, Dharma stambha), i.e. "pillars of the Dharma". 7th Major Pillar Edict. Brahmi script.

The inscriptions on the columns include a fairly standard text. The inscriptions on the columns join other, more numerous, Ashokan inscriptions on natural rock faces to form the body of texts known as the Edicts of Ashoka. These inscriptions were dispersed throughout the areas of modern-day Bangladesh, India, Nepal, Afghanistan and Pakistan and represent the first tangible evidence of Buddhism. The edicts describe in detail Ashoka's policy of Dhamma, an earnest attempt to solve some of problems that a complex society faced. In these inscriptions, Ashoka refers to himself as "Beloved servant of the Gods" (Devanampiyadasi). The inscriptions revolve around a few recurring themes: Ashoka's conversion to Buddhism, the description of his efforts to spread Buddhism, his moral and religious precepts, and his social and animal welfare program. The edicts were based on Ashoka's ideas on administration and behaviour of people towards one another and religion.

Alexander Cunningham, one of the first to study the inscriptions on the pillars, remarks that they are written in eastern, middle and western Prakrits which he calls "the Punjabi or north-western dialect, the Ujjeni or middle dialect, and the Magadhi or eastern dialect." They are written in the Brahmi script.

=== Minor Pillar Edicts ===
These contain inscriptions recording their dedication, as well as the Schism Edicts and the Queen's Edict. They were inscribed around the 13th year of Ashoka's reign.

- Sanchi pillar (Schism Edict) The Minor Pillar Edict located at Sanchi Stupa has a different context than most of the other edicts written by Ashoka. Instead of addressing the general populace, the edict specifically addresses the monastic community (sangha) of Buddhism. The content of the edict warns against creating divisions within the monastic community and states what the consequences will be for those who support divisions. This is an indication that the pillar had multiple uses as both a religious monument and an instrument of imperial governance. Also, The location of the pillar near the Great Stupa is likely to have served both as a visual cue to pilgrims or monks who would be walking by and as evidence of their connection to the imperial powers of the region. Both the stupa and the surrounding religions and monuments reinforce the connection between kingship and Buddhism.
- Sarnath pillar (Schism Edict)
- Allahabad Pillar (Schism Edict, Queen Edict, and also Major Pillar Edicts)
- Lumbini (Rummindei), Nepal (the upper part broke off when struck by lightning; the original horse capital mentioned by Xuanzang is missing) was erected by Ashoka where Buddha was born.
- Nigali Sagar (or Nigliva), near Lumbini, Rupandehi district, Nepal (originally near the Buddha Konakarnana stupa)
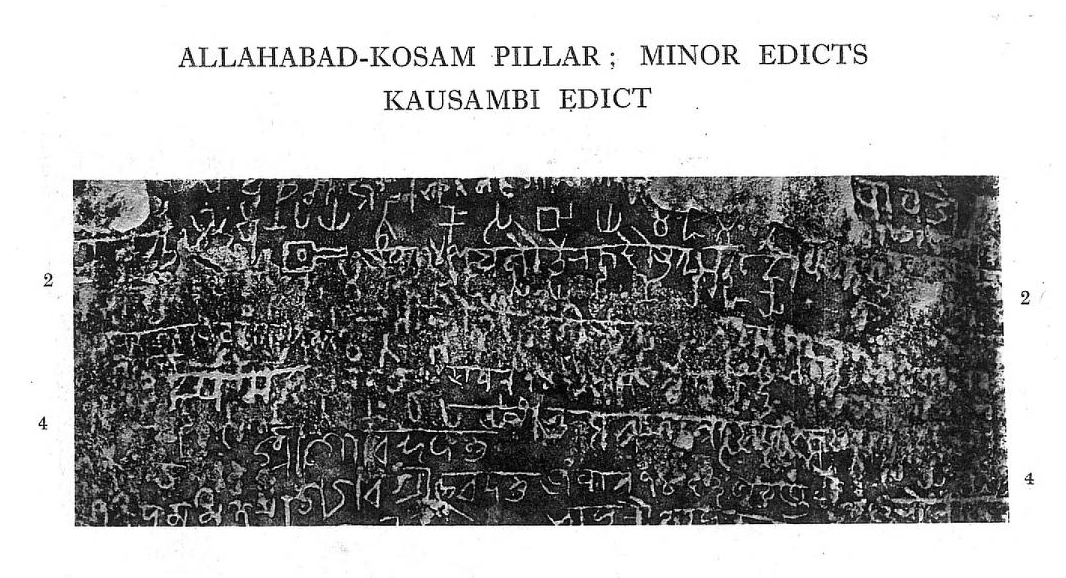
Kosambi-Allahabad Schism Edict.

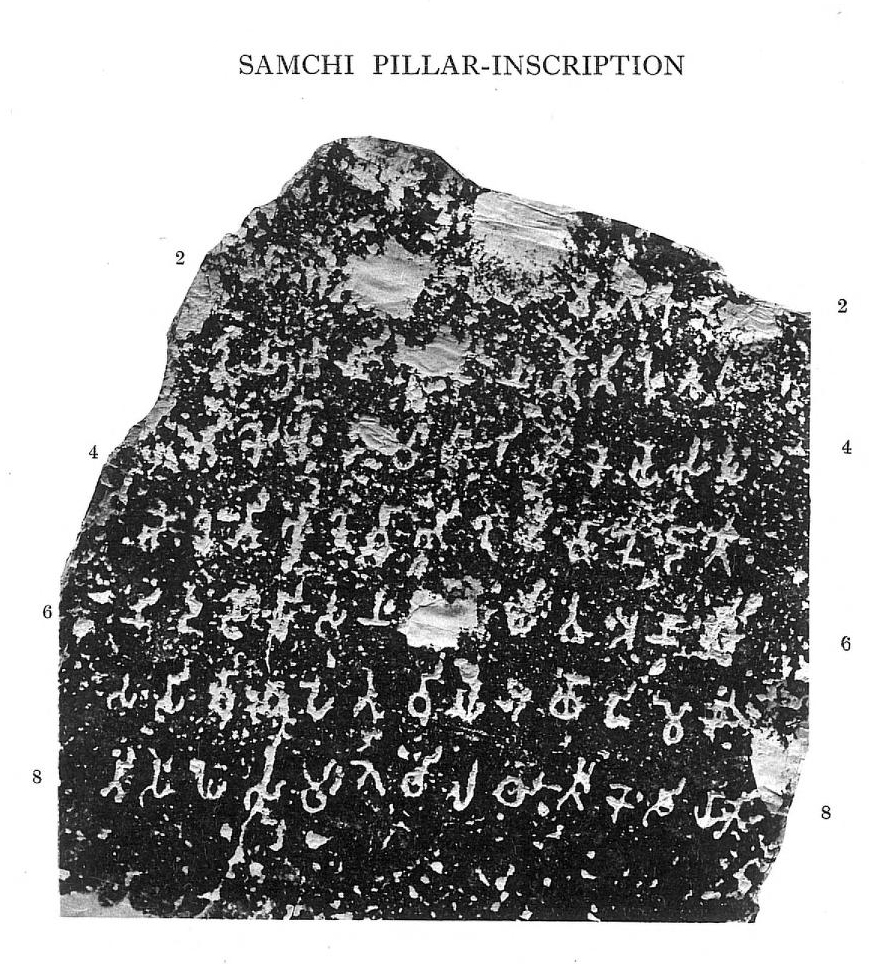
Sanchi Schism Edict.

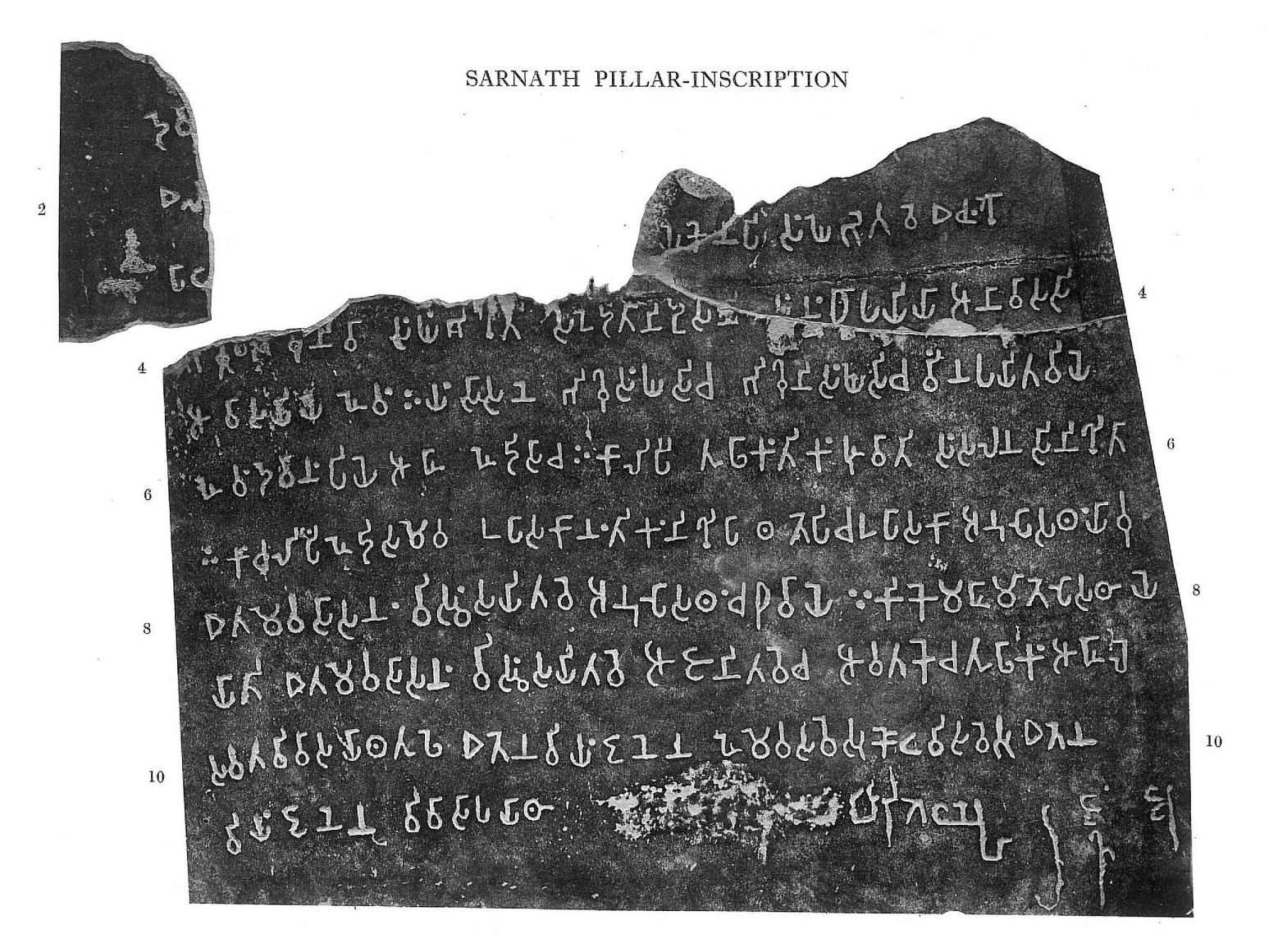
Sarnath Schism Edit.

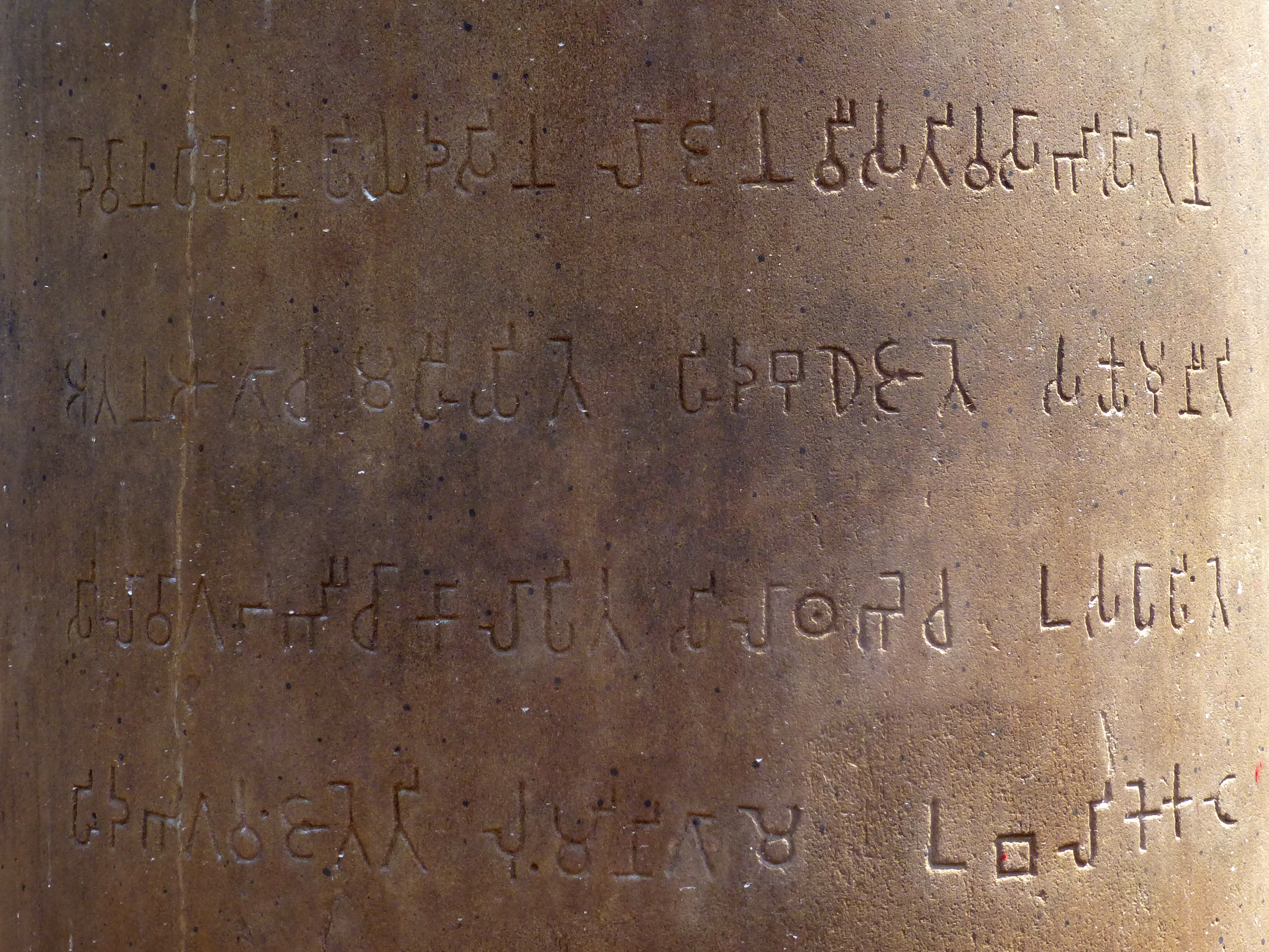
Rummindei, in Lumbini.

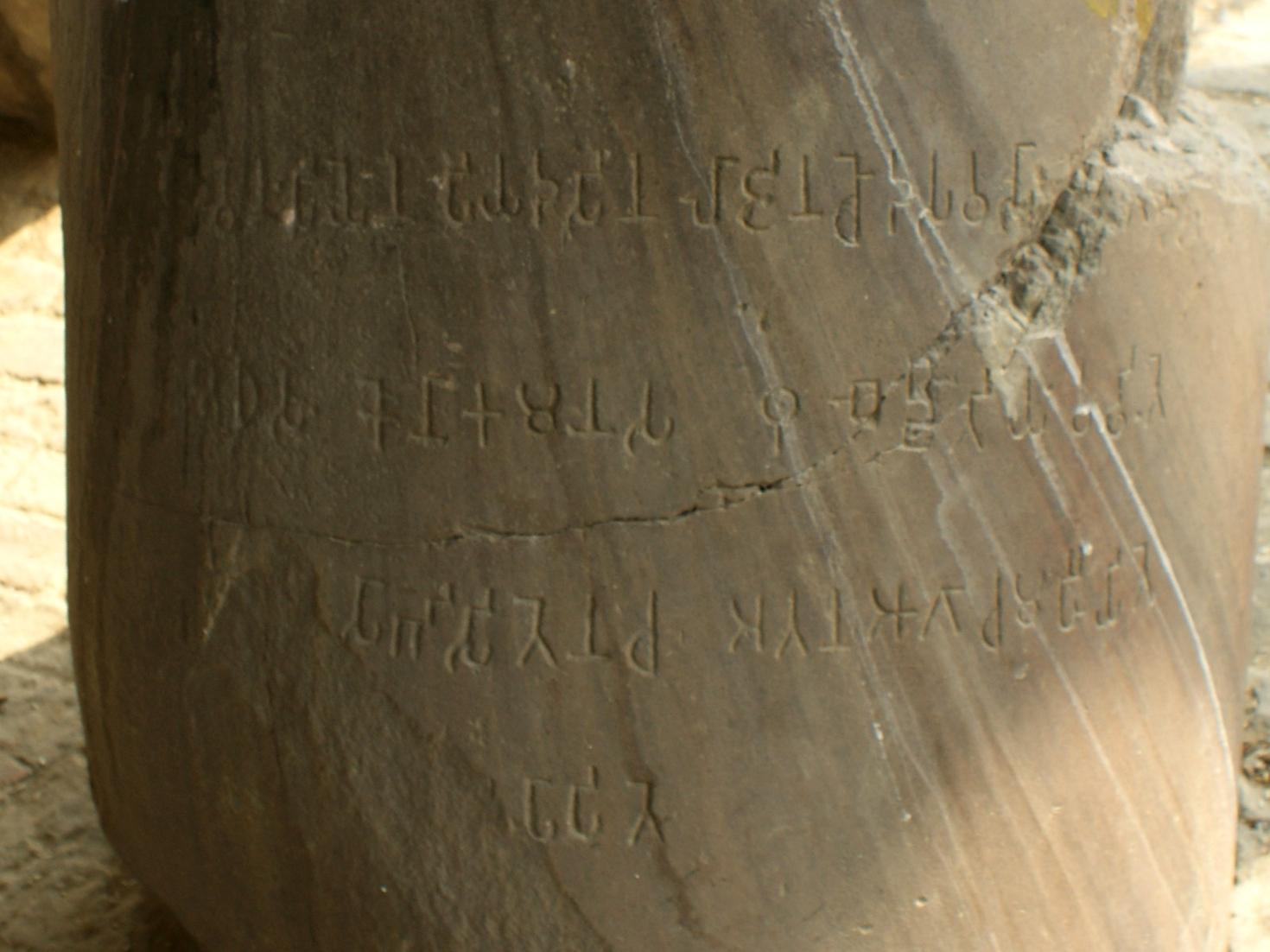
Nigali Sagar.

=== Major Pillar Edicts ===
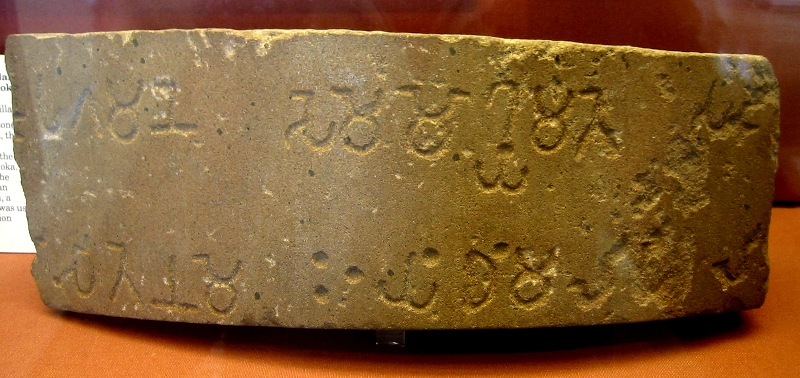
Fragment of the 6th Major Pillar Edict, from the Delhi-Meerut Pillar of Ashoka, British Museum.

Asoka's 6 Major Pillar Edicts have been found at Kausambhi (Allahabad), Topra (now Delhi), Meerut (now Delhi), Lauriya-Araraj, Lauriya-Nandangarh, Rampurva (Champaran), and a 7th one on the Delhi-Topra pillar.

These pillar edicts include:

- I Asoka's principle of protection to people
- II Defines dhamma as minimum of sins, many virtues, compassion, liberality, truthfulness and purity
- III Abolishes sins of harshness, cruelty, anger, pride etc.
- IV Deals with duties of government officials
- V List of animals and birds which should not be killed on some days and another list of animals which cannot be killed on any occasion. Describes release of 25 prisoners by Asoka.
- VI Works done by Asoka for Dhamma Policy. He says that all sects desire both self-control and purity of mind.
- VII Testimental edict.
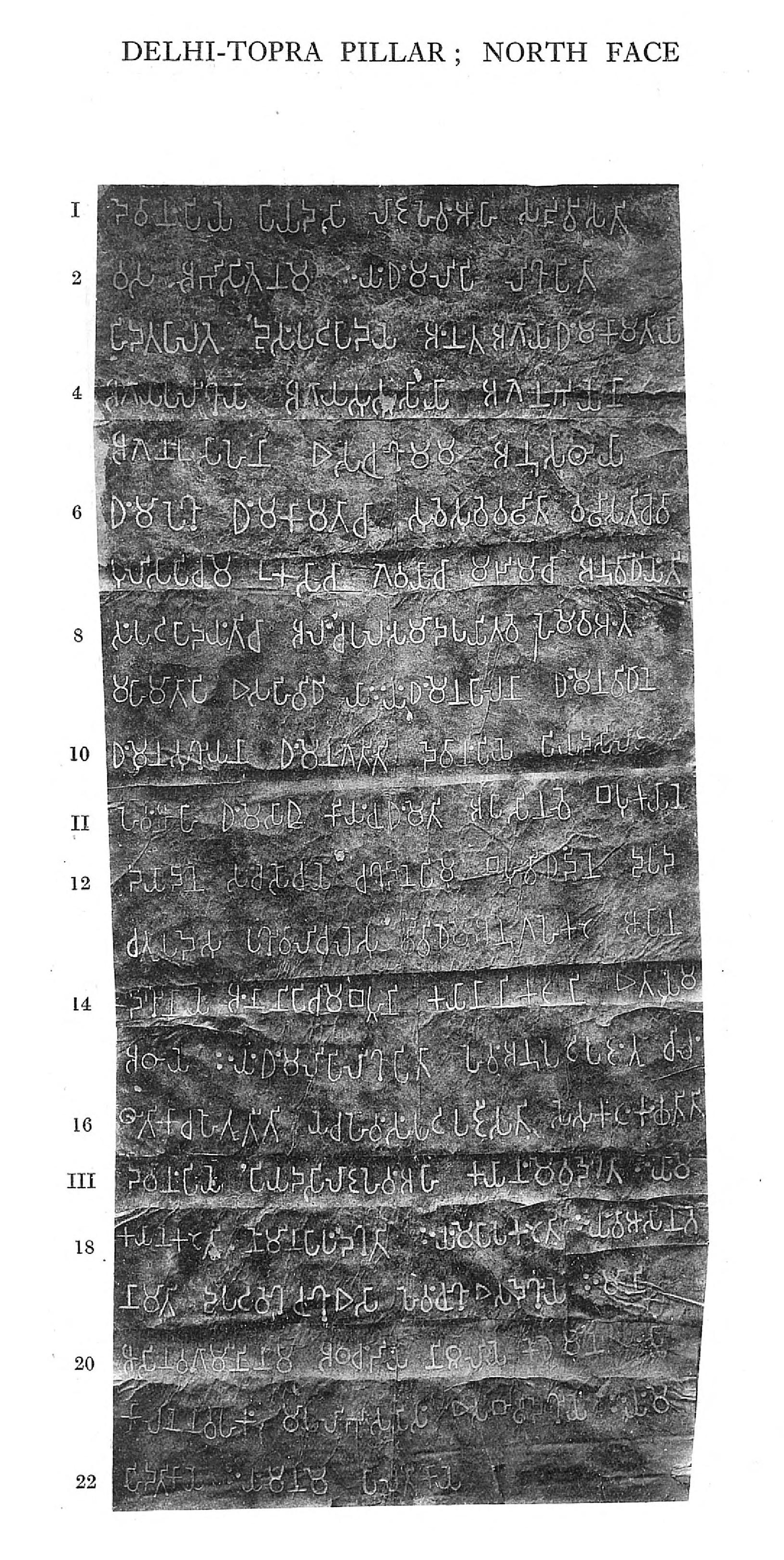
Major Pillar Edicts I, II, III (Delhi-Topra)

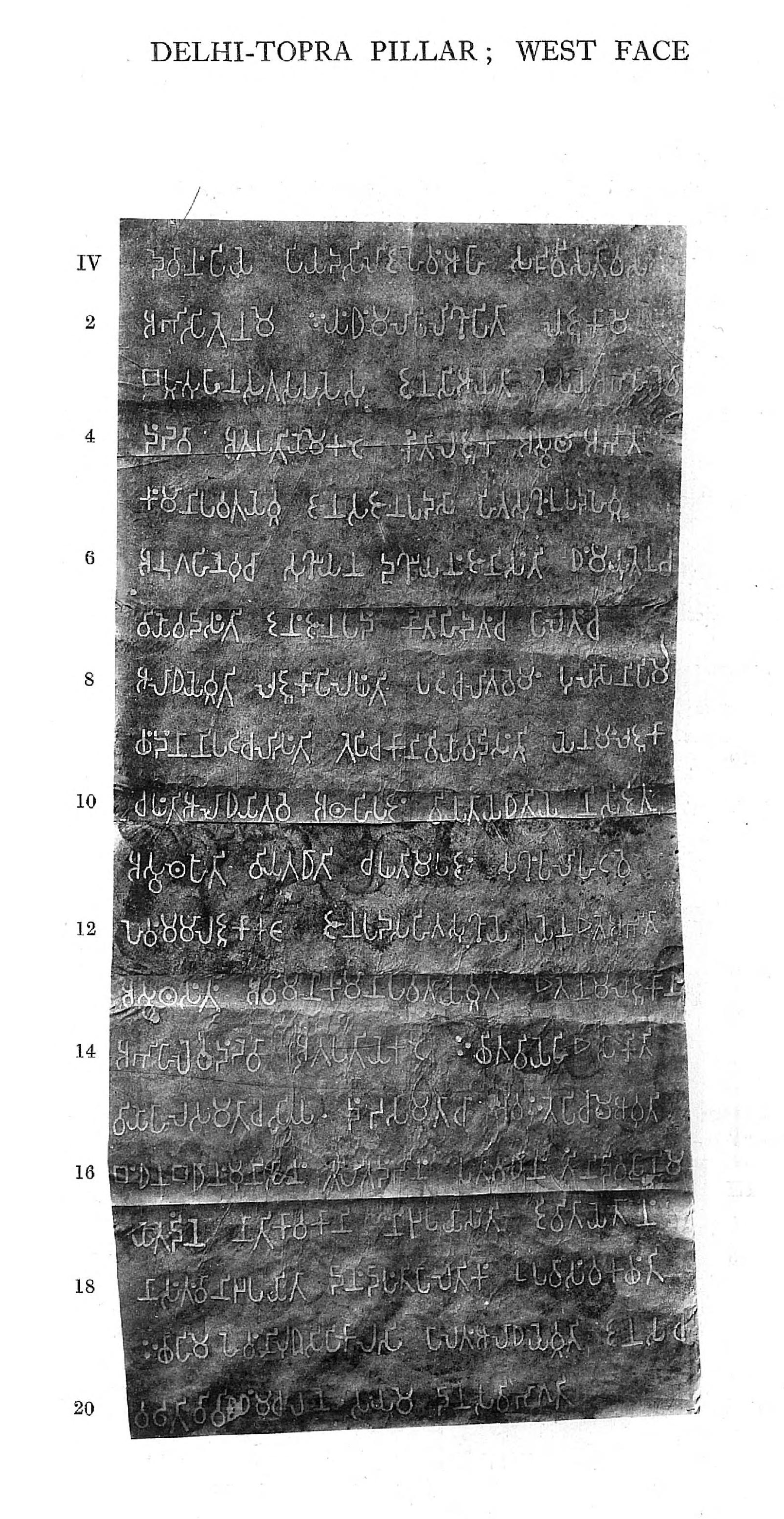
Major Pillar Edicts IV (Delhi-Topra)

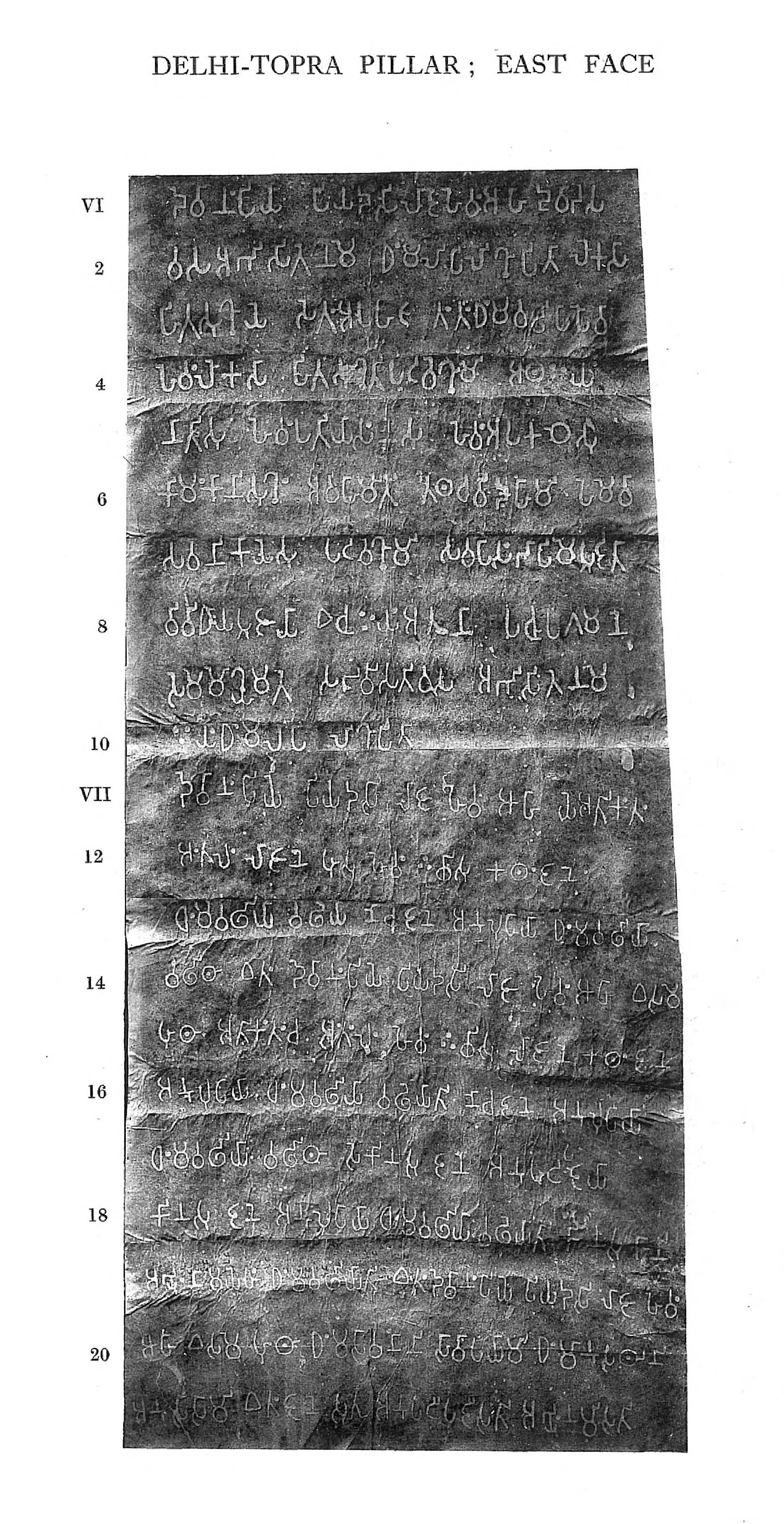
Major Pillar Edicts V-VII (Delhi-Topra)

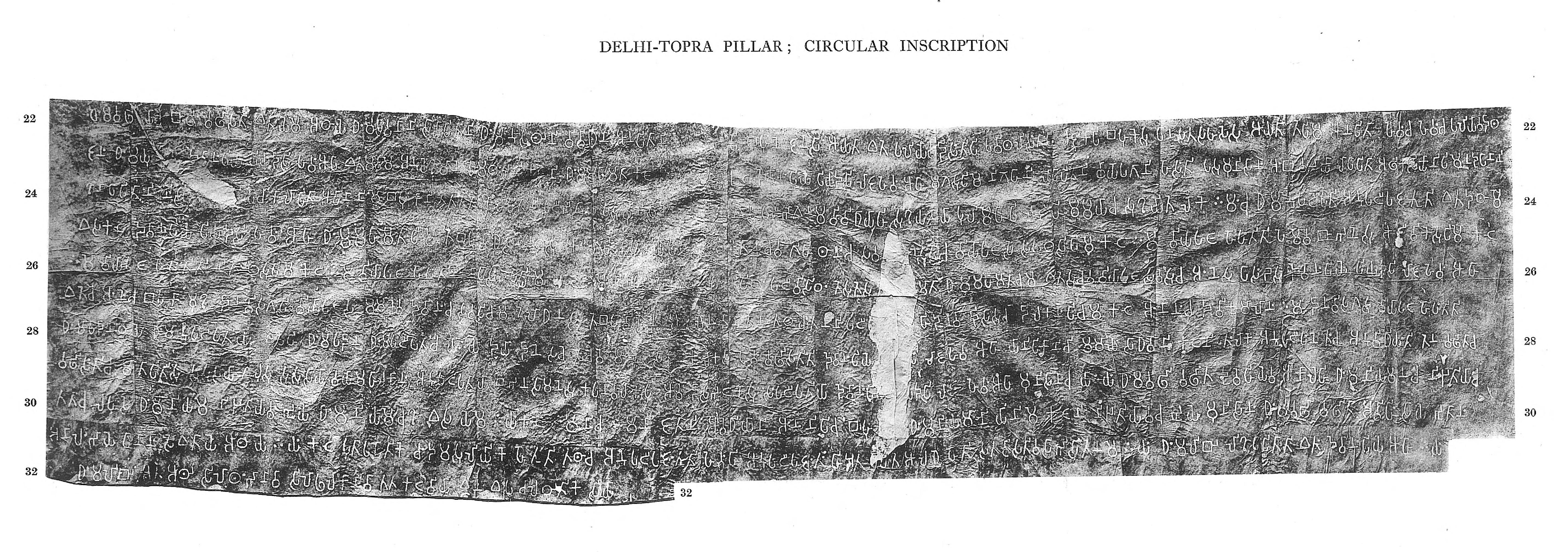
Major Pillar Edicts VII, second part (Delhi-Topra)

== Description of the pillars ==
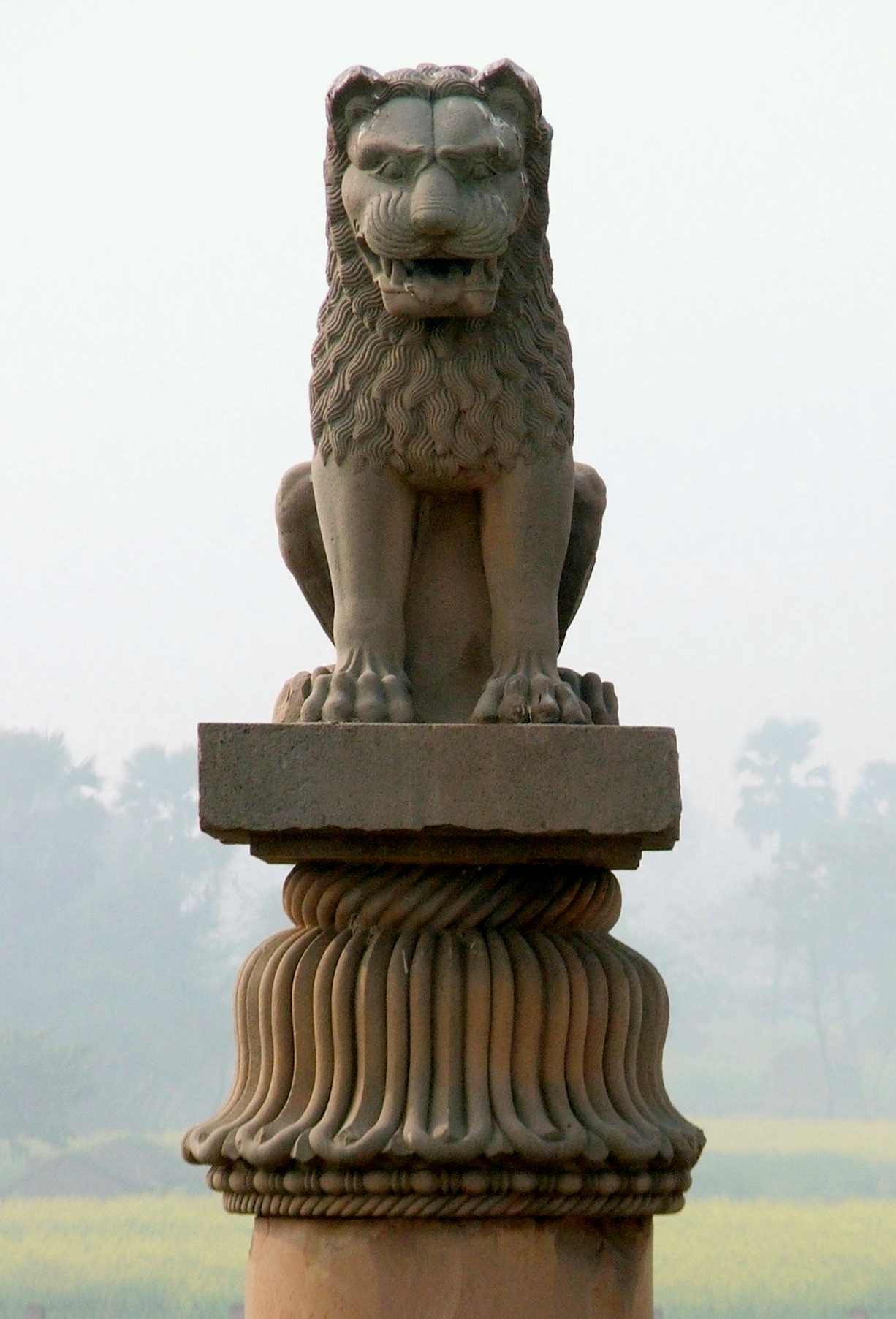
Front view of the single lion capital in Vaishali.

=== Pillars retaining their animals ===
The most celebrated capital is the four-lion one at Sarnath (Uttar Pradesh), erected by Emperor Ashoka circa 250 BC. Four lions are seated back to back. At present the column remains in the same place whereas the Lion Capital is at the Sarnath Museum. This Lion Capital of Ashoka from Sarnath has been adopted as the National Emblem of India and the wheel "Ashoka Chakra" from its base was placed onto the centre of the flag of India.

The lions probably originally supported a Dharma Chakra wheel with 24 spokes, such as is preserved in the 13th century replica erected at Wat Umong near Chiang Mai, Thailand by Thai king Mangrai.

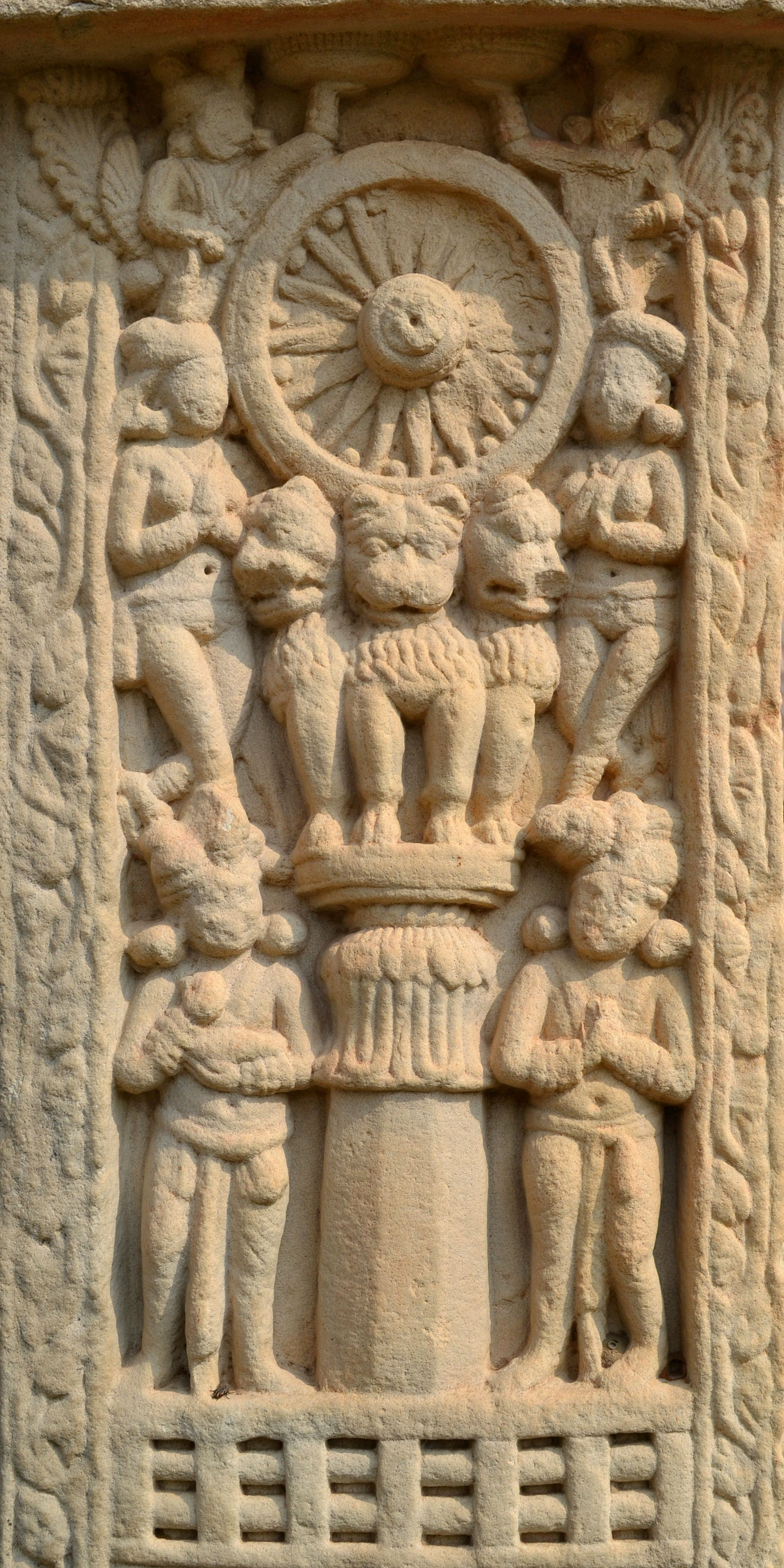
Depiction of the four lions capital surmounted by a Wheel of Law at Sanchi, Satavahana period, South gateway of stupa 3.

The pillar at Sanchi also has a similar but damaged four-lion capital. There are two pillars at Rampurva, one crowned with a bull and the other with a lion. Sankissa has only a damaged elephant capital, which is mainly unpolished, though the abacus is at least partly so. No pillar shaft has been found, and perhaps this was never erected at the site.

The Vaishali pillar has a single lion capital. The location of this pillar is contiguous to the site where a Buddhist monastery and a sacred coronation tank stood. Several stupas suggesting a far-flung campus for the monastery have been discovered. The lion faces north, the direction Buddha took on his last voyage. Identification of the site for excavation in 1969 was aided by the fact that this pillar still jutted out of the soil. More such pillars exist in this greater area but they are all devoid of the capital.

=== Pillar at Prayagraj ===
In Prayagraj there is a pillar with inscriptions from Ashoka and later inscriptions attributed to Samudragupta and Jehangir. It is clear from the inscription that the pillar was first erected at Kaushambi, an ancient town some 30 kilometres west of Allahabad that was the capital of the Koshala kingdom, and moved to Allahabad, presumably under Muslim rule.

The pillar is now located inside the Allahabad Fort, also the royal palace, built during the 16th century by Akbar at the confluence of the Ganges and Yamuna rivers. As the fort is occupied by the Indian Army it is essentially closed to the public and special permission is required to see the pillar. The Ashokan inscription is in Brahmi and is dated around 232 BC. A later inscription attributed to the second king of the Gupta empire, Samudragupta, is in the more refined Gupta script, a later version of Brahmi, and is dated to around 375 AD. This inscription lists the extent of the empire that Samudragupta built during his long reign. He had already been king for forty years at that time and would rule for another five. A still later inscription in Persian is from the Mughal emperor Jahangir. The Akbar Fort also houses the Akshay Vat, an Indian fig tree of great antiquity. The Ramayana refers to this tree under which Lord Rama is supposed to have prayed while on exile.

=== Pillars at Lauriya-Areraj and Lauriya-Nandangarh ===
The column at Lauriya-Nandangarh, 23 km from Bettiah in West Champaran district, Bihar has single lion capital. The hump and the hind legs of the lion project beyond the abacus. The pillar at Lauriya-Areraj in East Champaran district, Bihar is presently devoid of any capital.

=== Erecting the Pillars ===
The Pillars of Ashoka may have been erected using the same methods that were used to erect the ancient obelisks. Roger Hopkins and Mark Lehrner conducted several obelisk erecting experiments including a successful attempt to erect a 25ton obelisk in 1999. This followed two experiments to erect smaller obelisks and two failed attempts to erect a 25-ton obelisk.

== Rediscoveries ==
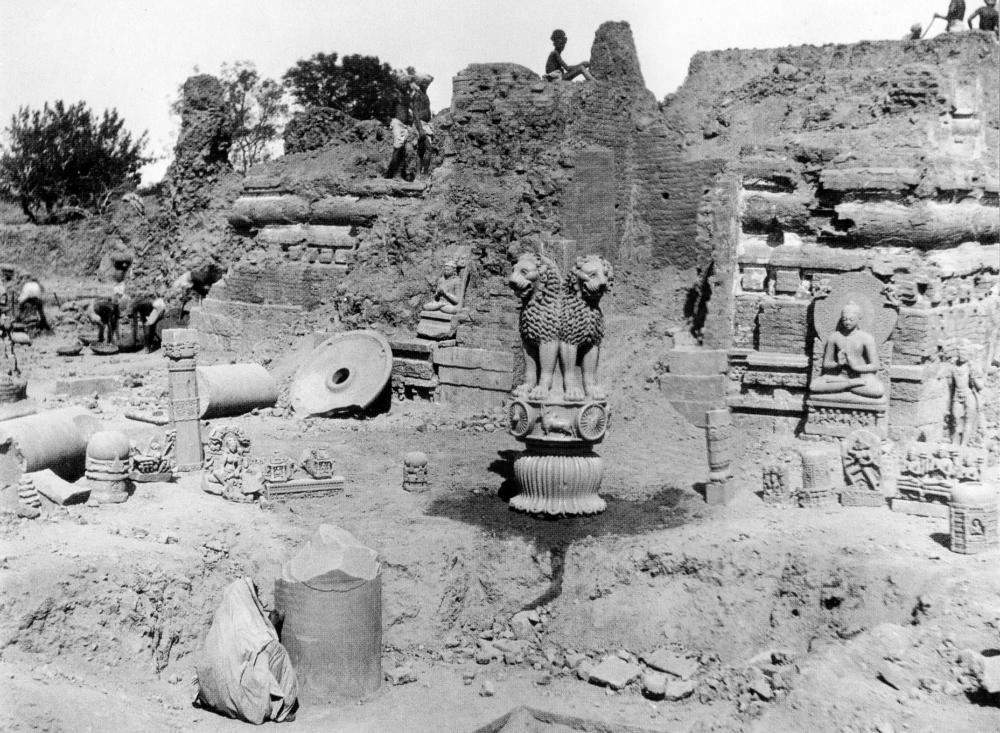
Rediscovery of the Ashoka pillar in Sarnath, 1905.

A number of the pillars were thrown down by either natural causes or iconoclasts, and gradually rediscovered. One was noticed in the 16th century by the English traveller Thomas Coryat in the ruins of Old Delhi. Initially he assumed that from the way it glowed that it was made of brass, but on closer examination he realized it was made of highly polished sandstone with upright script that resembled a form of Greek. In the 1830s James Prinsep began to decipher them with the help of Captain Edward Smith and George Turnour. They determined that the script referred to King Piyadasi which was also the epithet of an Indian ruler known as Ashoka who came to the throne 218 years after Buddha's enlightenment. Scholars have since found 150 of Ashoka's inscriptions, carved into the face of rocks or on stone pillars marking out a domain that stretched across northern India and south below the central plateau of the Deccan. These pillars were placed in strategic sites near border cities and trade routes.

The Sanchi pillar was found by F.O. Oertelin in 1851 in excavations led by Sir Alexander Cunningham, first head of the Archaeological Survey of India. There were no surviving traces above ground of the Sarnath pillar, mentioned in the accounts of medieval Chinese pilgrims, when the Indian Civil Service engineer F.O. Oertel, with no real experience in archaeology, was allowed to excavate there in the winter of 1904–05. He first uncovered the remains of a Gupta shrine west of the main stupa, overlying an Ashokan structure. To the west of that he found the lowest section of the pillar, upright but broken off near ground level. Most of the rest of the pillar was found in three sections nearby, and then, since the Sanchi capital had been excavated in 1851, the search for an equivalent was continued, and the Lion Capital of Ashoka, the most famous of the group, was found close by. It was both finer in execution and in much better condition than that at Sanchi. The pillar appeared to have been deliberately destroyed at some point. The finds were recognised as so important that the first onsite museum in India (and one of the few then in the world) was set up to house them.

== Other Ashokan structures ==
The Buddha's Diamond Throne and the Pillars of Ashoka

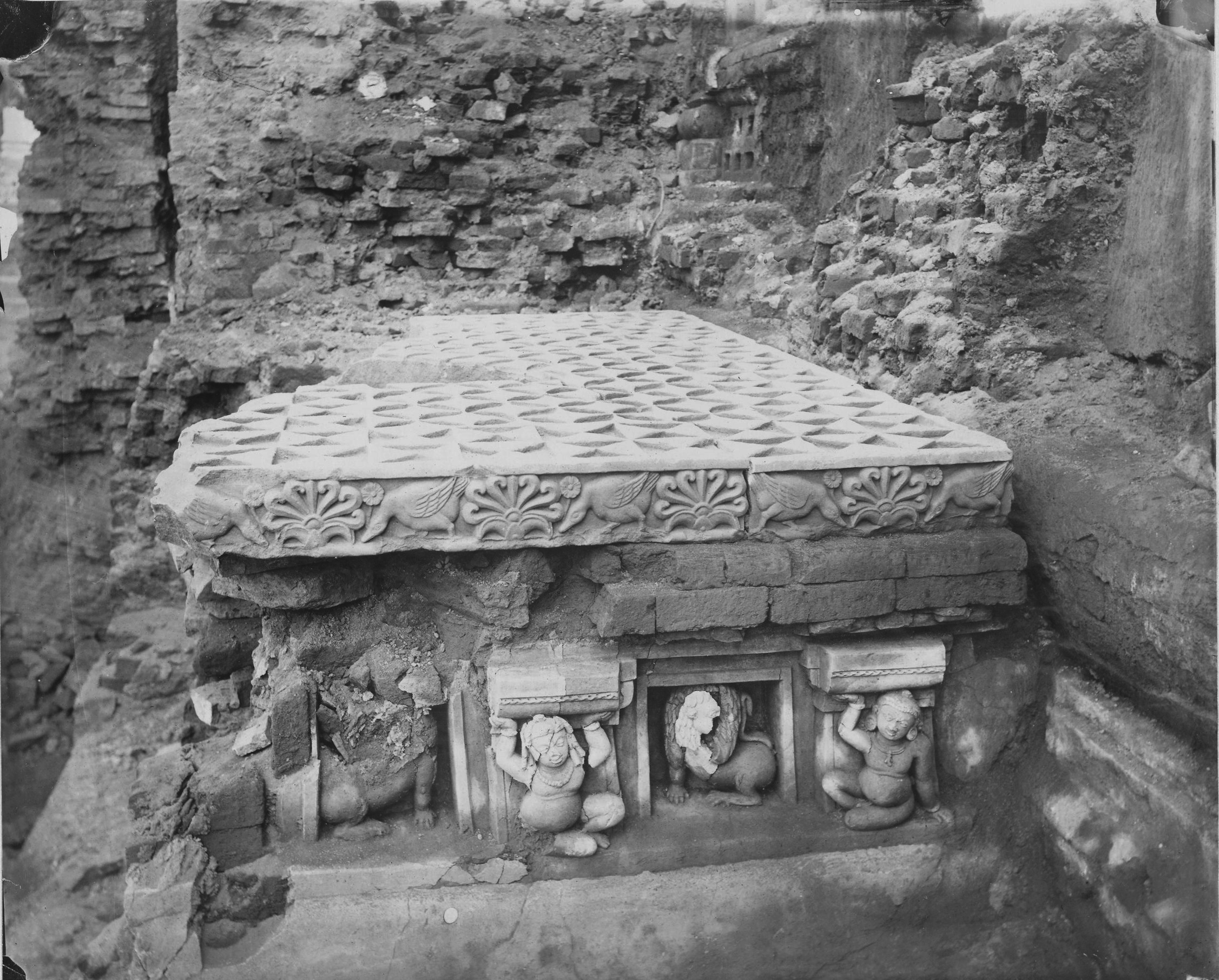
Discovery of Ashoka's Diamond throne in Bodh Gaya, near the spot of the Buddha's illumination and the Boddhi tree.

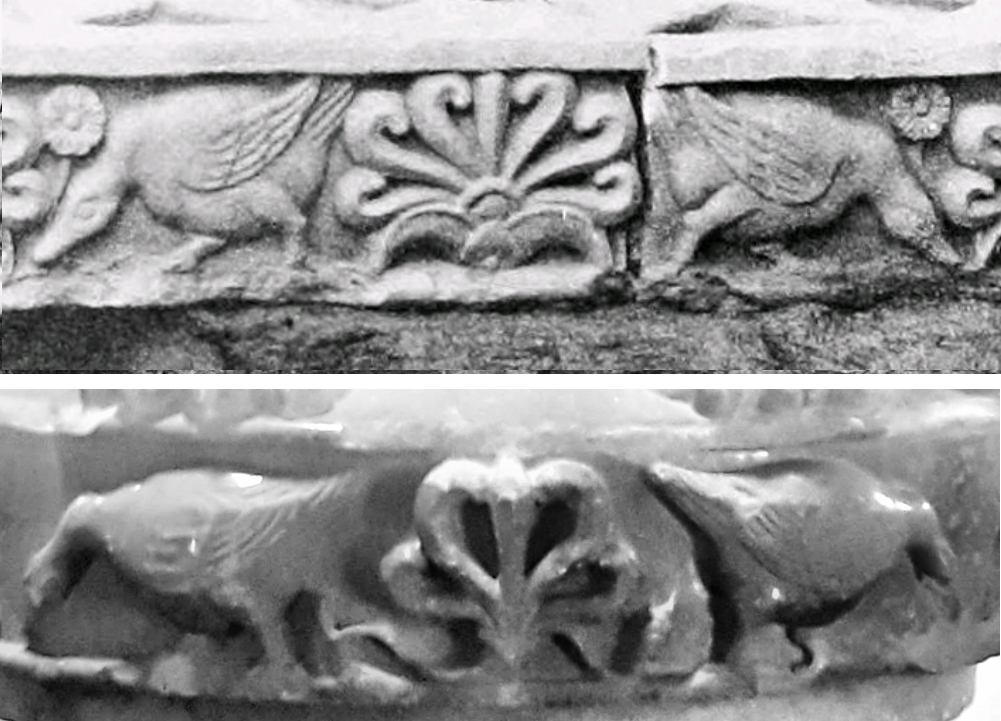
Side decorative bands of the Diamond Throne (top) and the Sanchi pillar capital (bottom), both featuring geese and flame palmettes.

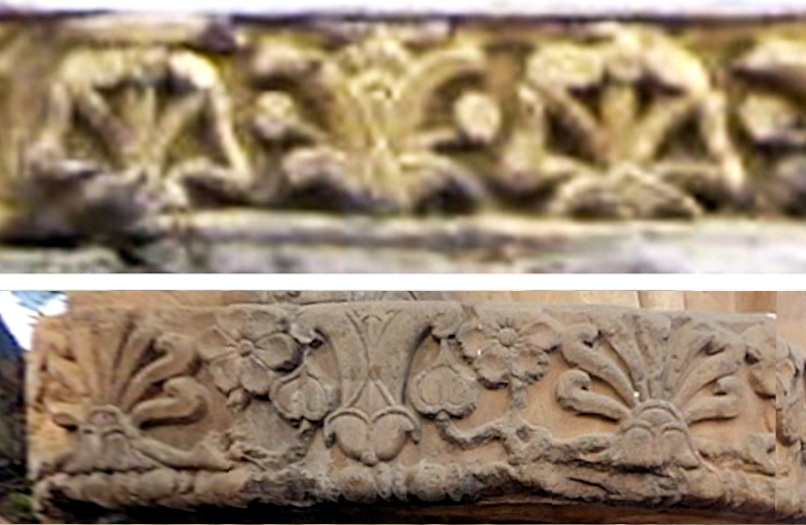
Front decorative friezes of the Diamond Throne (top) and the Sankissa pillar capital (bottom), both alternating flame palmettes, rosettes and lotuses.

Stupas

According to legend, Ashoka built 84,000 stupas commemorating the events and relics of Buddha's life. Some of these stupas contained networks of walls containing the hub, spokes and rim of a wheel, while others contained interior walls in a swastika (卐) shape. The wheel represents the sun, time, and Buddhist law (the wheel of law, or dharmachakra), while the swastika stands for the cosmic dance around a fixed centre and guards against evil.

"Diamond throne" in Bodh Gaya

Ashoka also built the Diamond Throne in Bodh Gaya, at the location where the Buddha had reached enlightenment some 200 years earlier. This purely Buddhist monument to the Buddha is a thick slab of polished grey sandstone with Mauryan polish

The sculpted decorations on the Diamond Throne clearly echo the decorations found on the Pillars of Ashoka. The Diamond Throne has a decorative band made of honeysuckles and geese, which can also be found on several of the Pillars of Ashoka, such as the Rampurva capitals or the Sanchi capital. The geese (hamsa) in particular are a very recurrent symbol on the pillars of Ashoka, and may refer to the devotees flocking to the faith. The same throne is also illustrated in later reliefs from Bharhut, dated to circa 100 BC.

== See also ==
Related topics

- Major Rock Edicts
- Minor Rock Edicts
- Dhar iron pillar
- Iron pillar of Delhi
- List of Edicts of Ashoka
- Hall of 80 pillars
- Ashoka's Hell
- Barabar Caves

Other similar topics

- Early Indian epigraphy
- Hindu temple architecture
- History of India
- Indian copper plate inscriptions
- Indian rock-cut architecture
- Lak Mueang
- List of rock-cut temples in India
- Outline of ancient India
- South Indian Inscriptions
- Tagundaing
- Stambha
- Huabiao
- Code of Hammurabi
