= Alois Anton Führer =

German indologist and Catholic priest (1853–1930)

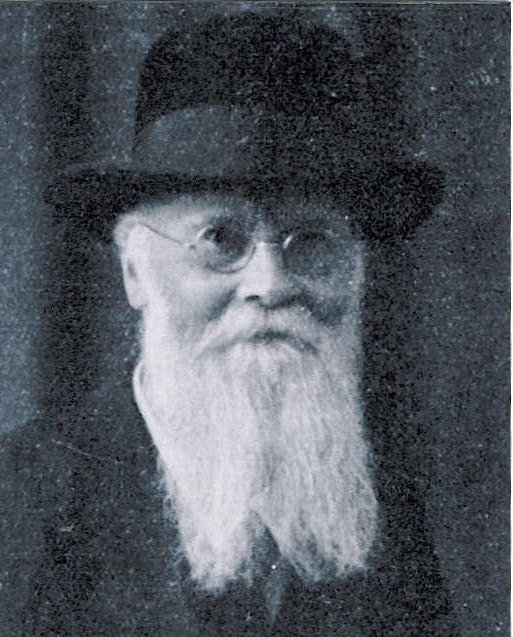
- Born: 26 November 1853; Limburg an der Lahn, Germany
- Died: 5 November 1930 (aged 76); Binningen, Switzerland
- Occupation: Indologist

Alois Anton Führer (26 November 1853 – 5 November 1930) was a German Indologist who worked for the Archaeological Survey of India (ASI). He is known for his archaeological excavations, which he believed proved that Gautama Buddha was born in Lumbini, Nepal. Führer's archaeological career ended in disgrace as "a forger and dealer in fake antiquities", and he had to resign from his position in 1898.

== Early life ==
Alois Anton Führer was born on 26 November 1853 in Limburg an der Lahn, Germany, into a German Catholic family. He studied Roman Catholic theology and Oriental studies at the University of Würzburg, was ordained in 1878 and received his PhD in 1879. His Sanskrit lecturer, Julius Jolly, was associated with the Bombay School of Indology. Probably due to him, he was appointed as a teacher of Sanskrit at St Xavier's Institute in Bombay.

In 1882, Führer was able to publish two lectures about Hindu Law in the Journal of the Bombay Branch of the Royal Asiatic Society. Retrospectively, the lectures have been shown to be almost entirely plagiarized from earlier works: only about one-tenth of the content has been shown to be his own.

Führer left the Catholic Church around 1884 and converted to Anglicanism which cost him his job; he returned to Germany, from where he applied for a new job in the museum in Lucknow in India.

== Appointment in India and archaeological activities ==
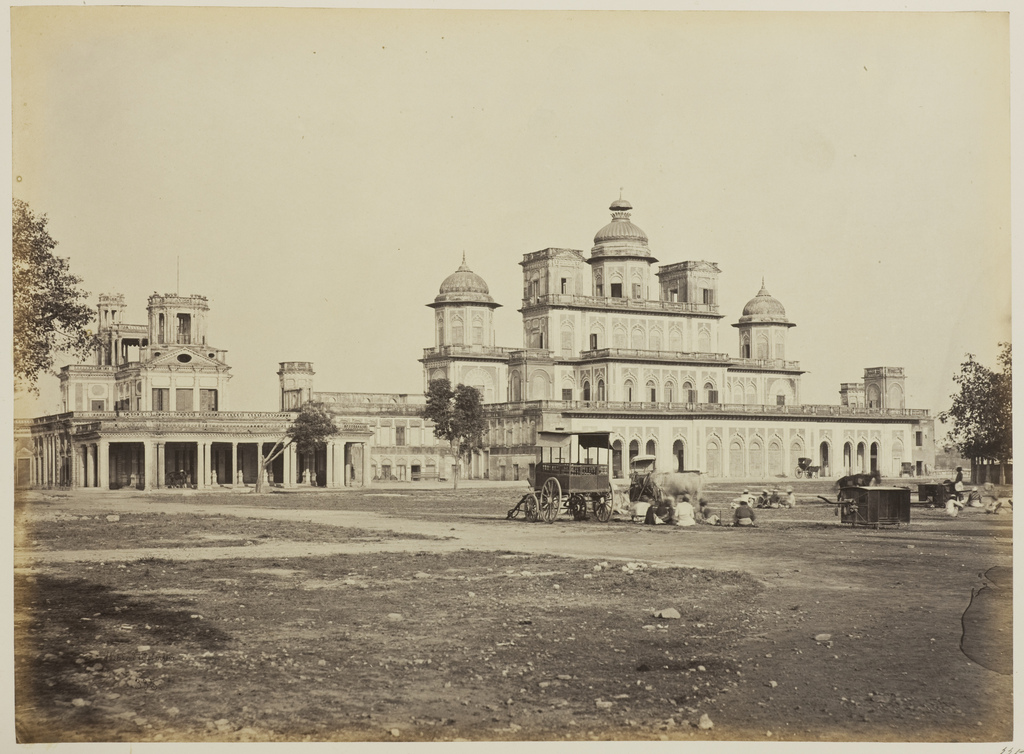
Building of the Choti Chattar Manzil, initial location of the Lucknow Provincial Museum.

=== Curator of Lucknow Provincial Museum ===
Führer came back to India in 1885 and on his arrival Alfred Comyn Lyall appointed him Curator of the Lucknow Provincial Museum. Führer started work in March and immediately set about improving the museum. Impressed by the changes, Lyall, the Chair of the Museum's Management Committee, wrote to Calcutta asking whether a part-time job for Führer could be found with the Archaeological Survey of India. He thus came to hold a double appointment, one as Curator at the museum and the other as Archaeological Surveyor to the North-Western Provinces. As his Progress Reports show, he was part of the N-W.P. and Oudh Circle of the Archaeological Survey.

=== Nepal (1886) ===
In 1886, Führer was instructed by the government of the North-Western Provinces and Oudh and the Government of India to carry out an expedition to Nepal.

=== Mathura glory (1889–1891) ===
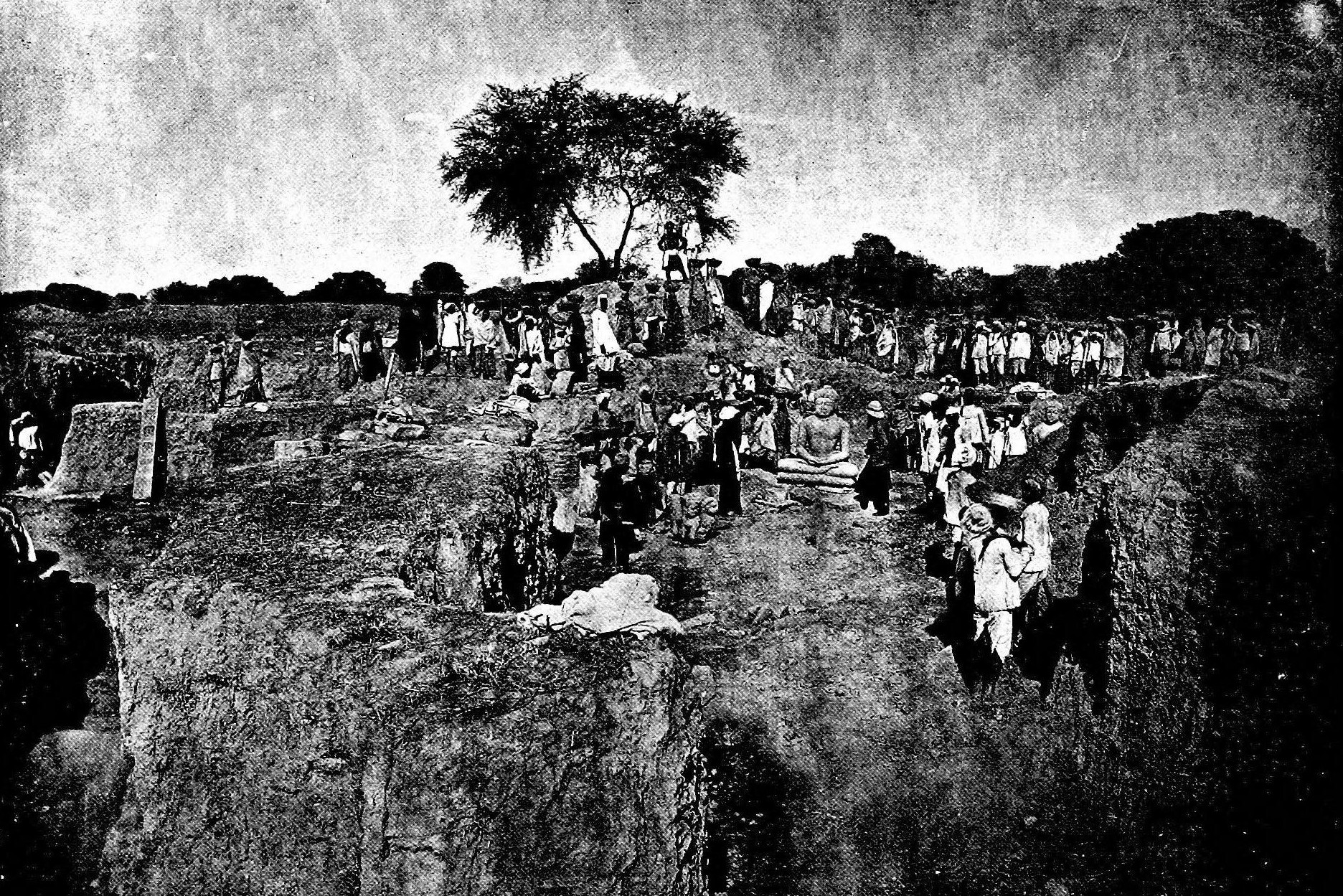
General view of the excavations in January 1889 at the Jain site of Kankali Tila, Mathura.

Later, Führer carried out very successful excavations at the Kankali Tila site of Mathura between 1889 and 1891 which improved understanding of the history of Jainism and gained him a reputation "as the most successful of the professional excavators". Still, Führer's reports continued to be the result of extensive plagiarization, taking especially from the work of his superior Georg Bühler at that time, although this is not clear-cut and may only be the result of intensive cooperation between the two. Führer's reports are also noted for being particularly vague and lacking details.

From 1888 severe lobbying aimed at reducing Government expenses started, and at curtailing the budget of the Archaeological Survey of India, a period of about ten years known as the "Buck crisis", after the Liberal Edward Buck. In effect, this severely threatened the employment of the employees of the ASI, including Führer, who had just started a family and become a father. These existential threats to his livelihood may have become "a motive for misbehaviour" on the part of Führer.

=== Ramnagar failure (1891) ===
In 1891, Führer started excavations at the Ramnagar site of Ahichchhatra. The excavations were quite disappointing. Pressured by the need to get results, Führer started to report invented discoveries, such as ancient dated inscriptions that never existed, and non-existent Jain inscriptions. Heinrich Lüders would later be able to show that the supposed Jain inscriptions were fakes compiled from earlier real inscriptions found in Mathura. In 1912 Lüders summarized "As all statements about epigraphical finds that admit of verification have proved to be false, it is very likely that no inscriptions at all have turned up".

In 1912, the German Indologist Heinrich Lüders identified in the Lucknow Provincial Museum forged inscriptions in Brahmi on artefacts belonging to Führer's excavations at Mathura and Ramnagar, forgeries which he attributed to Führer himself. Some of the forged inscriptions were direct copies of inscriptions on other objects, previously published in Epigraphia Indica.

=== Sanchi inscriptions (1891–1892) ===
Führer went to Sanchi during the 1891–1892 season and recovered tens of unpublished donative inscriptions, but these could not have the impact he hoped for. Only a new inscription by King Ashoka, for example, could achieve sufficient impact on public opinion.

Meanwhile, Edward Buck announced in 1892 that the Archaeological Survey of India would be shut down and all ASI staff would be dismissed by 1895, in order to generate savings for the Government's budget. The prospect of being fired anyway may have prompted Führer to act recklessly with his discoveries in a desperate attempt to avoid that fate. A great discovery within the next three years for example might be able to turn public opinion and save the funding of the ASI.

=== Burma invented inscriptions (1893–1894) ===
Reports of Führer's Burma "discoveries"

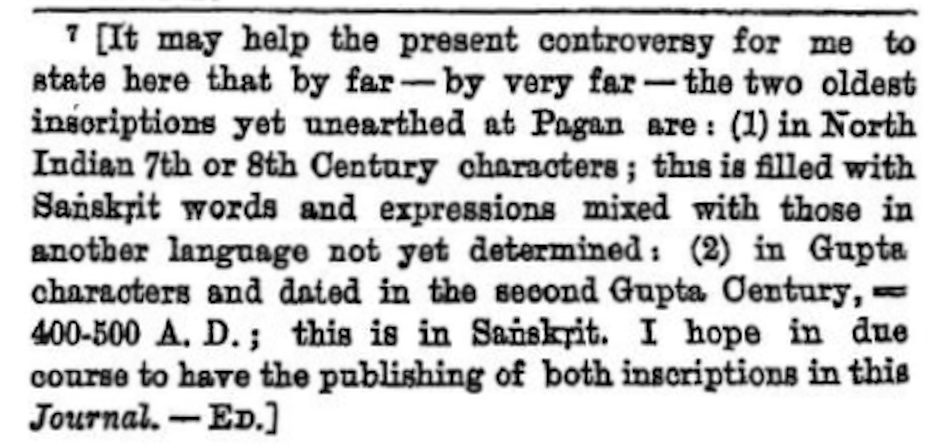
Führer's Burma discoveries in The Indian Antiquary Vol-xxiii (1894).

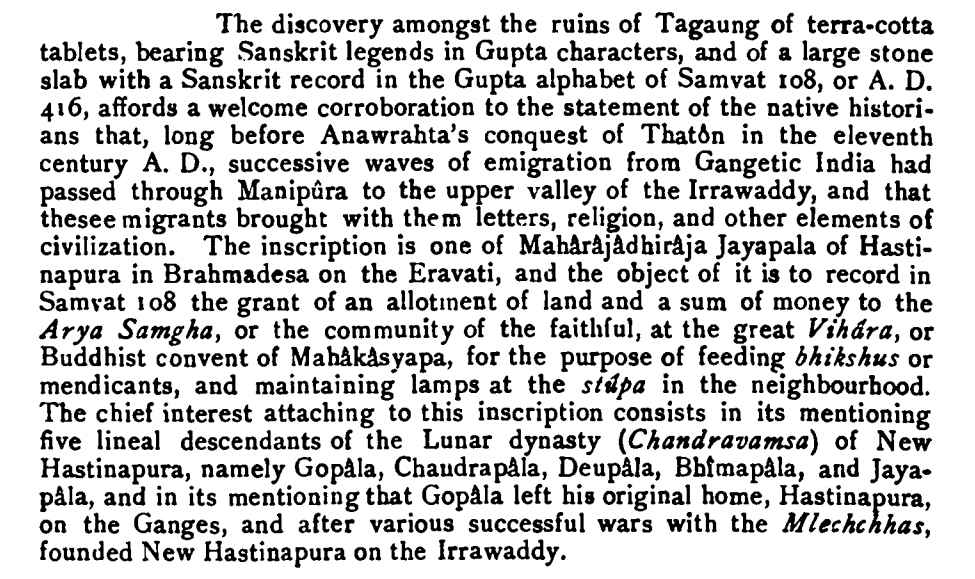
Führer's Burma "discoveries" in the Gazetteer of Upper Burma and the Shan States in 1900.

In 1893–1894, Führer was on a survey tour to Burma. In 1894, he published in his Progress Reports of the Epigraphical Section in the Working Season of 1893–94 the revolutionary discovery of three ancient Gupta inscriptions he said he found at Pagan and Tagaung in Burma, which pushed back the epigraphical knowledge of interactions with India by close to six centuries, generating huge acclaim. He elaborated a detailed description of the inscriptions he had supposedly found, without ever producing a drawing or a photographic proof, although he had a draftsman and a photographer with him on the expedition. Large extracts of his report were reproduced in The Indian Antiquary Vol. xxiv (1895). His "discovery" was taken at face value, and its conclusions repeated by many scholarly works such as the Gazetteer of Upper Burma and the Shan States in 1900, before being adopted by popular works as well: "by the early 1900s, anyone with an interest in the archeology of Burma had ample opportunity to read about the Gupta inscriptions in Fuhrer's own words".

It was only uncovered many years later that the inscriptions were actually inexistent, a fact which was revealed openly by Charles Duroiselle in 1921: "This Sanskrit inscription never existed, but was invented in toto by Dr Fuhrer while on a tour in Burma". Source analysis shows that he imagined the content of these inscriptions by basing himself on older publications and a list of kings from the Indian Hatthipala Jataka. These events marked "a scandalous career of forgery which would, some years later, come to an end in Kapilavastu".

=== Nigali-Sagar pillar of Ashoka (1895) ===
Nigali Sagar pillar with inscription
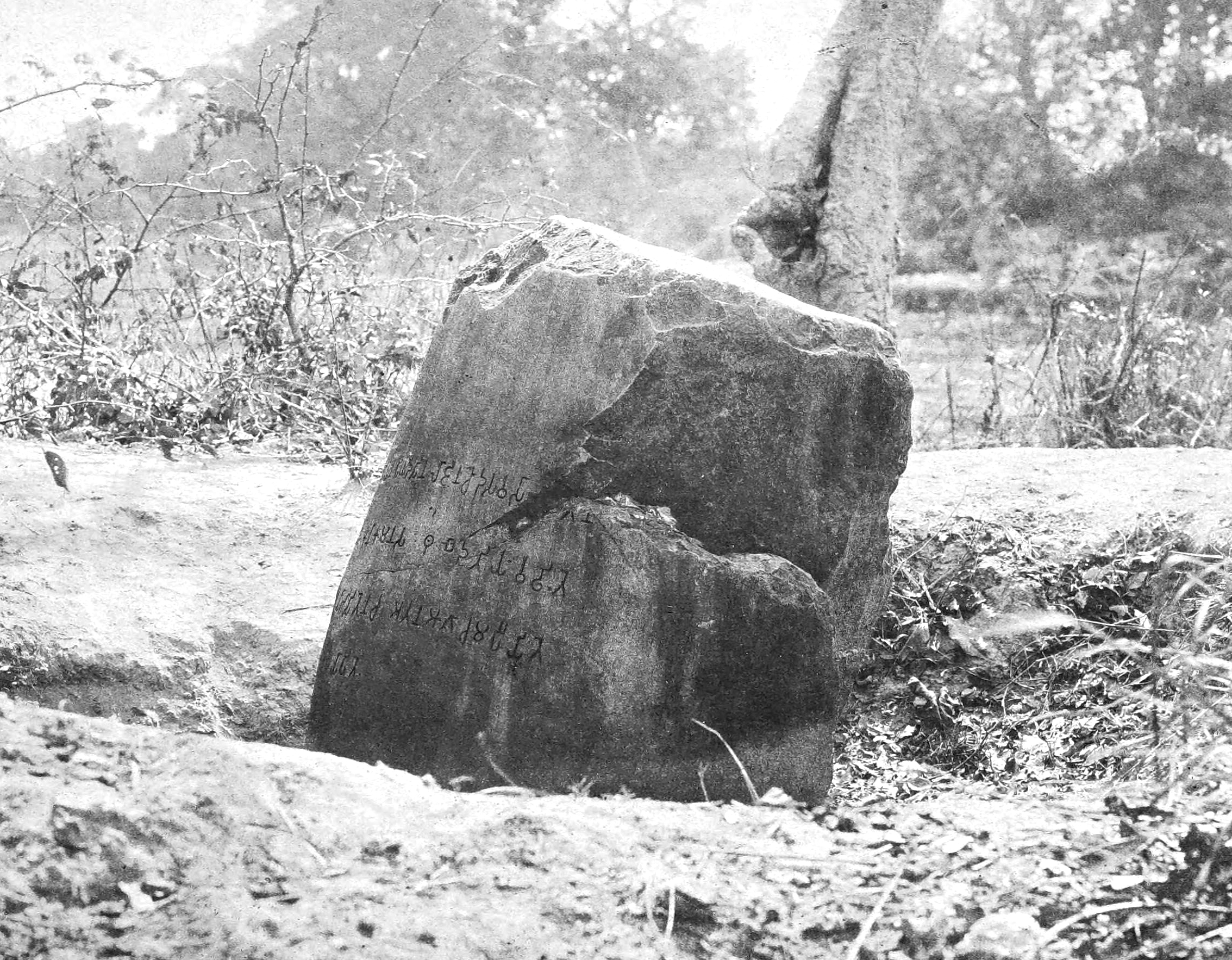
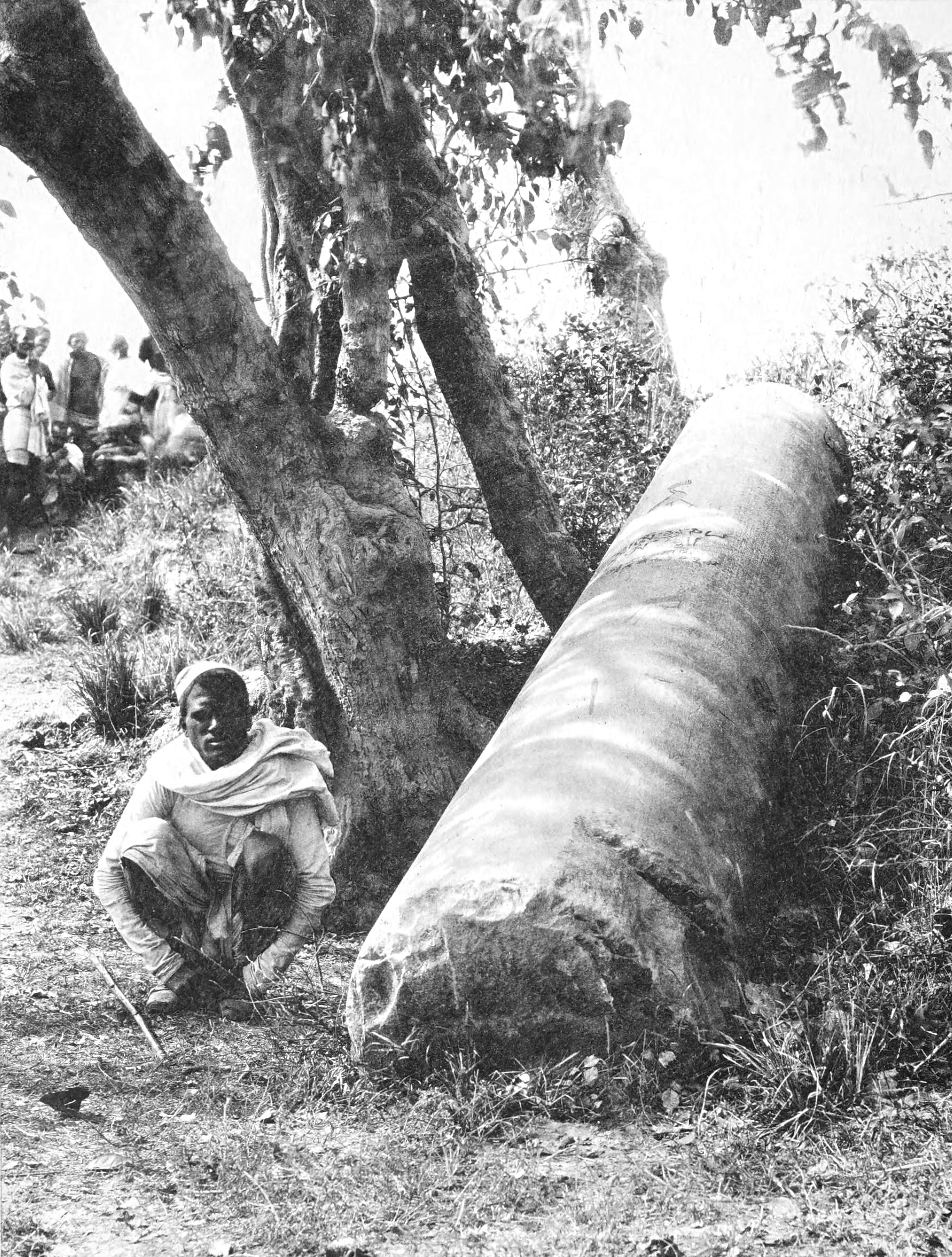
Nigali Sagar pillar stump with exposed inscription, and separated top portion.

The Nigali Sagar pillar (also called "Nigliva" pillar) was initially discovered by a Nepalese officer on a hunting expedition in 1893. In March 1895, Führer inspected the Nigali Sagar pillar, one of the pillars of Ashoka, and identified a Brahmi inscription said to be also from the time of Ashoka.

Besides his description of the pillar, Führer made a detailed description of the remains of a monumental "Konagamana stupa" near the Nigali Sagar pillar, which was later discovered to be an imaginative construct. Furher wrote that "On all sides around this interesting monument are ruined monasteries, fallen columns, and broken sculptures", when actually nothing can be found around the pillar. In the following years, inspections of the site showed that there were no such archaeological remains, and that, in respect to Führer's description "every word of it is false". It was finally understood in 1901 that Führer had copied almost word-for-word this description from a report by Alexander Cunningham about the stupas in Sanchi.

For the time being, the announcement of these great "discoveries" succeeded in bringing the "Buck Crisis" to an end, and the ASI was finally allowed in June 1895 to continue operations, subject to yearly approval based on successful digs every year. Georg Bühler, writing in July 1895 in the Journal of the Royal Asiatic Society, continued to advocate for the preservation of the Archaeological Survey of India, and expressed that what was needed were "new authentic documents" from the pre-Ashokan period, and they would "only be found underground".

=== Lumbini Ashoka inscription (1896) ===
Lumbini pillar inscription

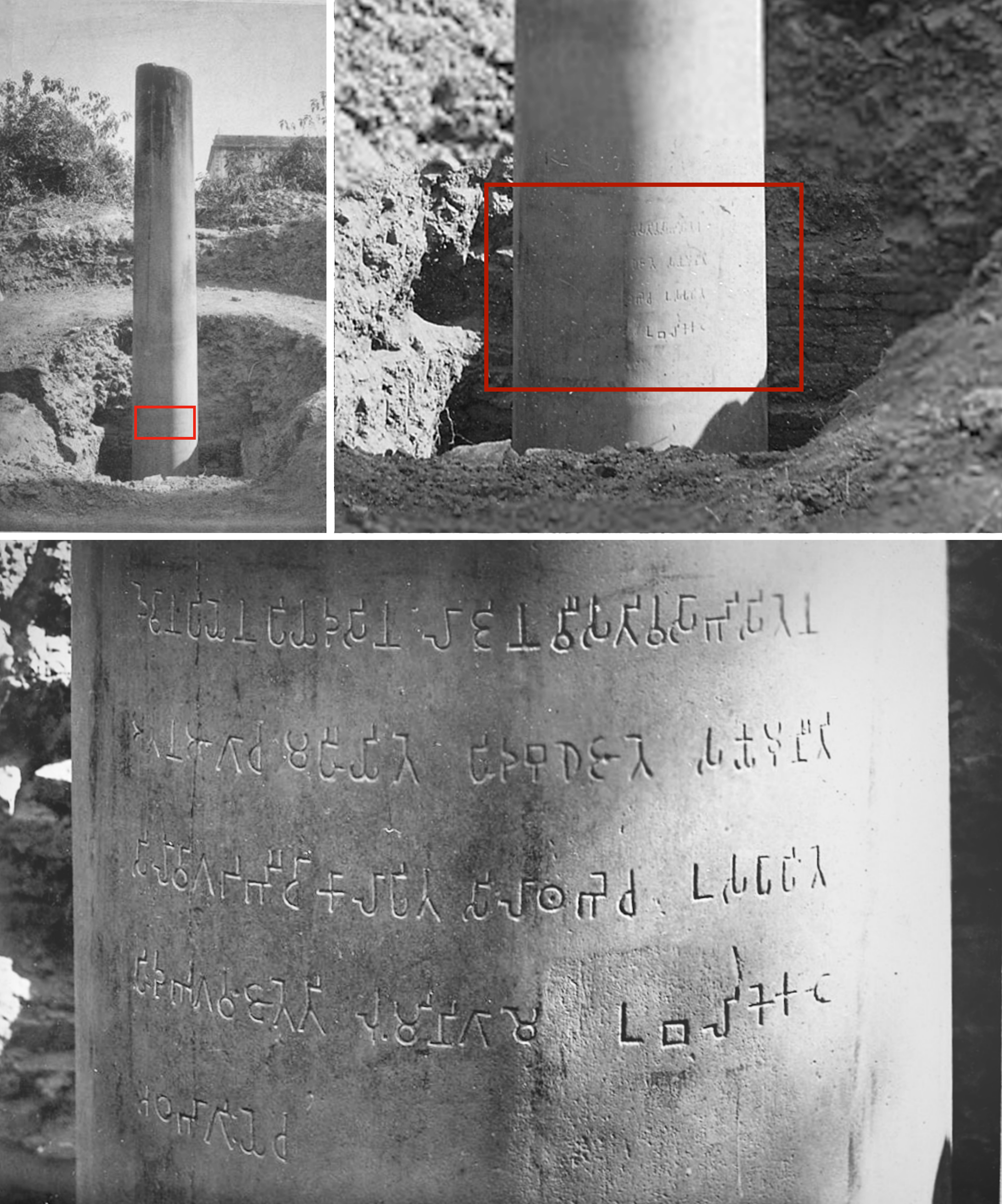
The Ashoka inscription mentioning the birth of the Buddha, in Lumbini.

In 1896, accompanied by the regional Nepalese governor, former Commander-In-Chief of the Nepalese Army General Khadga Shamsher Jang Bahadur Rana, Führer discovered a major inscription on a pillar of Ashoka, an inscription which, together with other evidence, confirmed Lumbini as the birthplace of the Buddha. The pillar itself had been known for some time already, as it had already been reported by Khadga Shamsher to Vincent Arthur Smith a few year earlier. Führer made his great discovery when he dug the earth around the pillar and reported the discovery of the inscription in a pristine state about one meter under the surface.

According to other accounts General Khadga Samsher Rana knew the location of the pillar and led Führer to it. Reportedly, Führer was not present when the inscription was discovered, as he arrived only "a little later", but Ricketts was witness to it. Initially, only the top of the pillar was visible, with a medieval inscription on it. The Nepalese authorities dug around the pillar, to find the ancient Brahmi inscription, which therefore had remained underground, hidden from view.

Führer claimed that the locals called the site "Rummindei", which he identified with the legendary "Lumbini", whereas it was found that the site was only called "Rupa-devi".

The authenticity of the discovery was questioned by some scholars, though in a 2008 book the British writer Charles Allen has concluded, "there is no doubt at all that it was Asoka the Great who erected the Asokan rock and pillar edicts". Harry Falk—a leading scholar of Ashoka's inscriptions—has stated that the authenticity of Ashoka's Lumbini inscription is "beyond dispute," and that "features of truly Aśokan script, some of them extinct at the middle of the second century BC" could not realistically have been forged by the "extremely clumsy" Führer who "was ill-educated in Prakrit phonology and morphology" and "was ignorant to the same degree of Brāhmī palaeography," therefore "disqualifying Führer as the author of a perfect fake."

Following the discovery of the pillar, Führer relied on the accounts of ancient Chinese pilgrims to search for Kapilavastu, which he thought had to be in Tilaurakot. Unable to find anything, he started excavating some structures he said were stupas, and was in the process of faking pre-Mauryan inscriptions on bricks, when he was caught in the act by Vincent Arthur Smith. The inscriptions were bluntly characterized by Smith as "impudent forgeries".

==== Dealings in forged relics of the Buddha and false inscriptions ====
Around the same time, Führer was selling fake relics "authentified" by a nonexistent inscription of Upagupta, the preceptor of Ashoka, to Shin U Ma, an important monk in Burma. He wrote to the Burmese monk: "Perhaps you have seen from the papers that I succeeded in discovering the Lumbini grove where Lord Buddha was born", noting that "you have unpacked the sacred relics of our Blessed Lord Buddha which are undoubtedly authentic, and which will prove a blessing to those which worship them faithfully". An "authentic tooth relics of the Buddha" sent by Führer in 1896 turned out to have been carved from a piece of ivory, and another sent in 1897 was that of a horse. The forgery was reported in 1898 to the British North-Western Provinces Government in India by Burmologist and member of the Burma commission Bernard Houghton, and started an enquiry which would lead to Führer's resignation on 16 September 1898.

=== Piprahwa (1898) ===
In January 1898, Führer was again involved in a major discovery, that of the reliquaries at Piprahwa, but apparently arrived only after the discovery was made, and apparently did not have time to tamper with the evidence.

=== Acclaim ===
These discoveries, at the time they were made, generated fantastic praise for the work of Führer. According to the New York Post (3 May 1896) the Nigliva discovery "seems to carry the origin of Buddhism much further back". The Liverpool Mercury (29 December 1896) reports that the discovery that Lumbini (also called Paderia) was "the actual birthplace of the Buddha ought to bring devout joy to about 627,000,000 people". The Pall Mall Gazette (18 April 1898) related that the Piprahwa discovery "contains no less a relic than the bones of the Buddha himself".

== Dismissal from government service ==
Führer's archaeological career ended in disgrace. Führer came under suspicion from March 1898 following the reported forgeries of the Buddha's relics.

=== Inquiry ===
A formal inquiry was launched into his activities, but officials struggled to find a "printable" reason for Führer's dismissal. Führer was officially confronted by Vincent Arthur Smith, who reported the forgeries of the Buddha's relics. Führer was exposed as "a forger and dealer in fake antiquities". Smith also blamed Führer for administrative failures in filing his reports to the Government, and for a false report about his preparations for future publications on his archaeological research: Führer was obliged to admit "that every statement in it [the report] was absolutely false." The false inscriptions supposed to authentify the Buddha relics were not mentioned in the investigations, apparently out of fear of casting doubt on the other epigraphical discoveries made by Führer. Similarly, the false publication of the ancient Burmese inscriptions, were the object of an institutional cover-up, which would not come to light before 1921, with the revelation of their inexistence made by Charles Duroiselle.

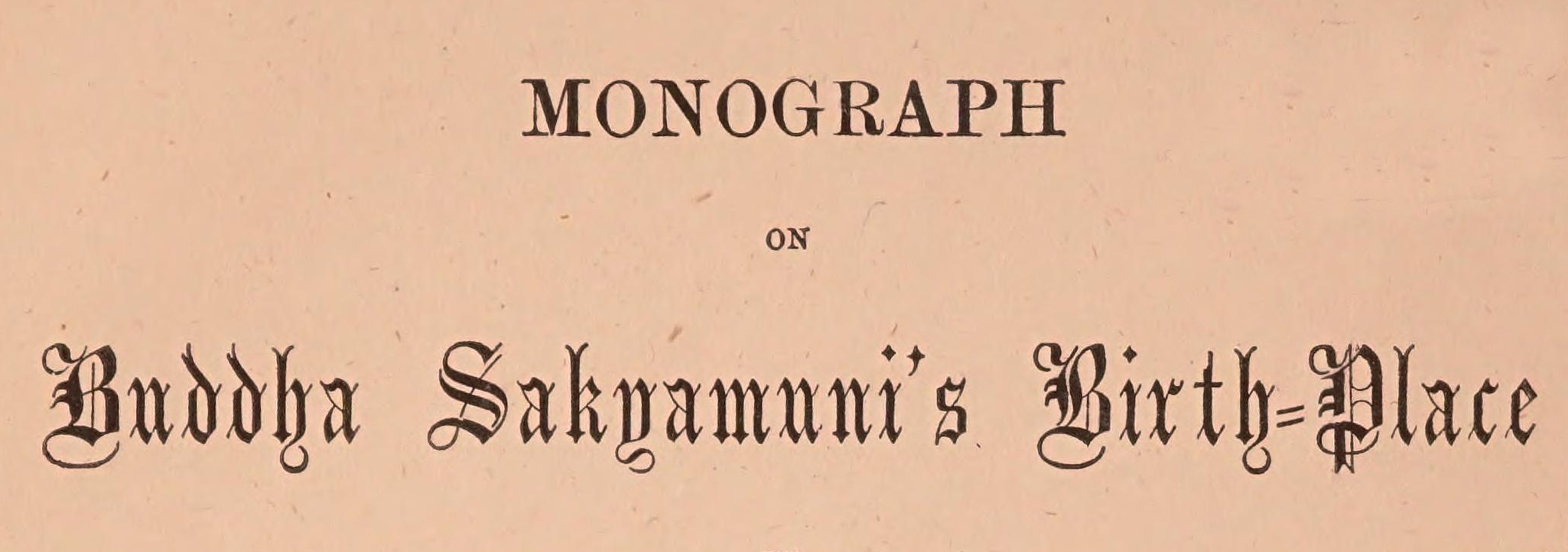
Führer's own report on his discoveries in Nepal, entitled Monograph on Buddha Sakyamuni's birthplace, 1897, was withdrawn from circulation.

In 1901, Vincent Arthur Smith, after retirement, chose to reveal the blunt truth about the Nepalese discoveries and published a stark analysis of Führer's activities, apparently worried that "the reserved language used in previous official documents has been sometimes misinterpreted". In particular, Smith said of Führer's description of the archaeological remains at Nigali Sagar that "every word of it is false", and characterized several of Führer's epigraphic discoveries as "impudent forgeries". However Smith never challenged the authenticity of the Lumbini pillar inscription and the Nigali Sagar inscription discovered by Führer.

=== Sanctions ===
Under official instructions from the Government of India, Führer's resignation was accepted and he was relieved of his positions, his papers seized and his offices inspected by Vincent Arthur Smith on 22 September 1898. Führer had written in 1897 a monograph on his discoveries in Nigali Sagar and Lumbini, Monograph on Buddha Sakyamuni's birth-place in the Nepalese tarai, which was withdrawn from circulation by the Government.

Führer was dismissed and returned to Europe with his family. He died on 5 November 1930 in Binningen, Switzerland.

Führer was replaced as Curator of the Lucknow Museum by Edmund Smith, previously the Province's Architectural Surveyor. The excavations in the Nepal Terai were entrusted to Babu Purna Chandra Mukherji, who published the results of his investigations in 1903 in A report on a tour of exploration of the antiquities in the Tarai, Nepal the region of Kapilavastu, in which A. Smith included an introduction entitled "Preparatory note" which details several of the forgeries made by Führer.

== Religious life ==
Führer had an unusual religious career. He served as a Catholic priest, but in 1887 converted to Anglicanism. Following his expulsion from government service in India, Führer made plans to become a Buddhist monk. Quoting the Ceylon Standard, the Journal of the Mahabodhi Society noted: "Much interest has been excited in Buddhist and other circles at the prospect of Dr Führer coming to Ceylon to join the Buddhist priesthood. The Press notices recently made regarding this gentleman have given rise to grave suspicion. We understand that Dr Führer will have an opportunity given him of refuting the charges made against him before he is accepted by the leading Buddhists here as an exponent of the religion of Buddha." These plans seem to have come to nothing because in 1901 Führer re-converted to the Christian Catholic Church of Switzerland and worked as a priest from 1906 to 1930.

== Works ==
- Führer, Alois Anton (1896). List of Christian tombs and monuments of archaeological or historical interest and their inscriptions in the North-Western Provinces and Oudh, Allahabad: Government Press, N.-W.P. and Oudh
- Führer, Alois Anton, ed. (1909). Śrīharṣacaritamahākāvyam - Bāṇabhaṭṭa's biography of King Harshavardhana of Sthāṇīśvara with Śaṅkara's commentary, Saṅketa, text and commentary with critical notes. Bombay: Government Central Press
- Führer, Alois Anton; Hultzsch, E; Burgess, James (1892–1894). Epigraphia Indica : a collection of inscriptions supplementary to the Corpus inscriptionum Indicarum, Calcutta: Government printing
- Führer, Alois Anton (1897). Monograph on Buddha Sakyamuni's birth-place in the Nepalese tarai. Allahabad : Govt. Press, N.W.P. and Oudh.
