= Piprahwa =

Piprahwa Piprahava
- village
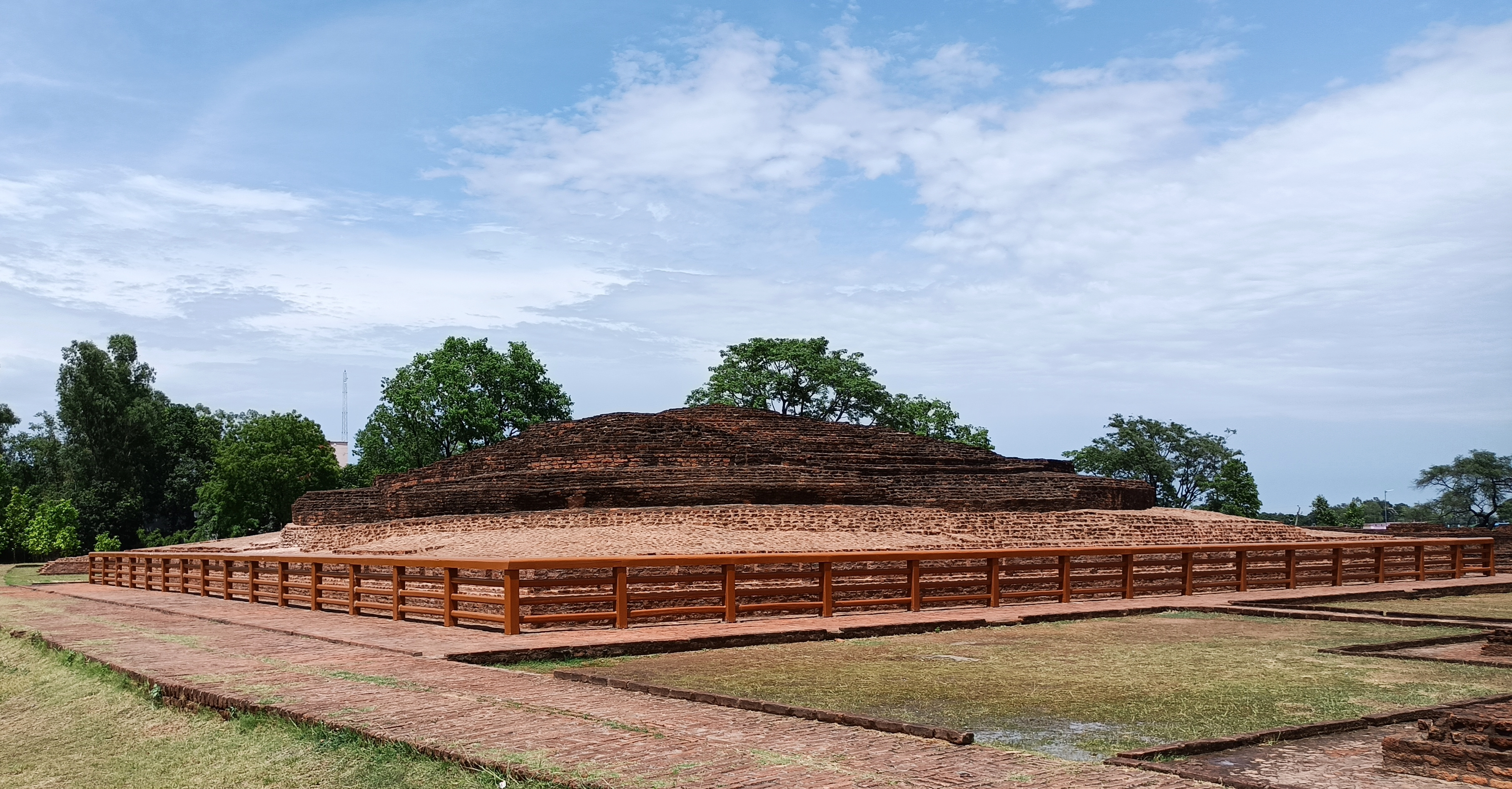
- Stupa at Piprahwa
- Interactive map of Piprahwa
- Location in Uttar Pradesh, India Piprahwa (Uttar Pradesh)
- Coordinates: 27.4430°N 83.1278°E
- Country: India
- State: Uttar Pradesh
- District: Siddharthnagar

Languages
  - Official: Hindi
- Time zone: UTC+05:30 (IST)

Piprahwa is a village near Siddharthnagar city in Siddharthnagar district of the Indian state of Uttar Pradesh. Kalanamak rice, a scented and spicy variety, is grown in this area. It lies in the heart of the historical Buddha's homeland and is 9 miles from the world heritage site of Lumbini that is believed to be the place of Gautama Buddha's birth.

Piprahwa is best known for its archaeological site and excavations that suggest that it was the burial place of the portion of the Buddha's ashes that were given to his own Shakya clan. A large stupa and the ruins of several monasteries as well as a museum are located within the site. Ancient residential complexes and shrines were uncovered at the adjacent mound of Ganwaria.

== Passing of the Buddha ==
The history of the Piprahwa stupa begins with the death of the Buddha. The Mahāparinibbāna Sutta says that an argument arose following his cremation around 480 BCE. 'The Sakyas of Kapilavatthu came to know that at Kusinara the Blessed One had died. And they sent a message to the Mallas of Kusinara, saying: "The Lord was the chief of our clan. We are worthy to receive a share of the Lord's remains, and we will make a great stupa for them." The Mallas replied "The Lord passed away in our parish. We will not give away any share of the Lord's remains." The Brahman, Dona, then intervened to remind them about the Buddha's teachings and suggested that they avoid 'strife, war and bloodshed' and split the relics between the eight kingdoms demanding a portion so that "far and wide Stupas may rise".

The Buddha's own Sakya clan received a share as did seven other kingdoms. They deposited them in eight stupas with two further stupas being built over the ashes of the cremation pyre and over the vessel in which the bones and ashes had been gathered.

In the centuries after the Sakyas built their stupa, all signs of Buddhism disappeared from the Buddha's homeland. A Brahmin Hindu revival saw the decline of Buddhism which migrated to Thailand, Sri Lanka, China, Cambodia etc. Statues were destroyed or decapitated during a succession of invasions by Persians, Arabs, Mongols, Mughals and assorted Hunas or Huns.

== Excavation by William Claxton Peppé ==
For over 2,000 years the stupa built by the Sakyas remained intact and covered with vegetation outside the village of Piprahwa on the Indian side of the border with Nepal. It even survived 50 years of stupa archaeology by the many Indophiles to be found in the British civil service. For all their efforts, they failed to find any reliquaries that claimed to hold the Buddha's relics. In 1897 a particularly large kot or earthen mound caught the attention of William Claxton Peppé, a British colonial engineer and landowner who had been inspired by the recent discovery of the Lumbini pillar that marked the birthplace of the Buddha. The Indian famine of 1896–97 had decimated the region leaving the tenant farmers on his estate in need of work. Peppé led a team excavating what Indologist Vincent Smith advised him was an unusually early example of an ancient Buddhist stupa 'probably dating from the era of Asoka the Great.' Having cleared away scrub and jungle, they set to work building a deep trench through the mound. After digging through 18 feet of solid brickwork, they came to a large stone coffer which contained five small vases containing bone fragments, gold ornaments and intricately fashioned jewellery. These reliquaries together held the largest group of precious offerings ever recorded in a single deposit: around 1,800 gemstones and semi-precious stones (many shaped and drilled), rock crystal, pearls, shell, coral, embossed sheet gold and silver, granulated gold, as well as bone and ash assumed to be of great sanctity.

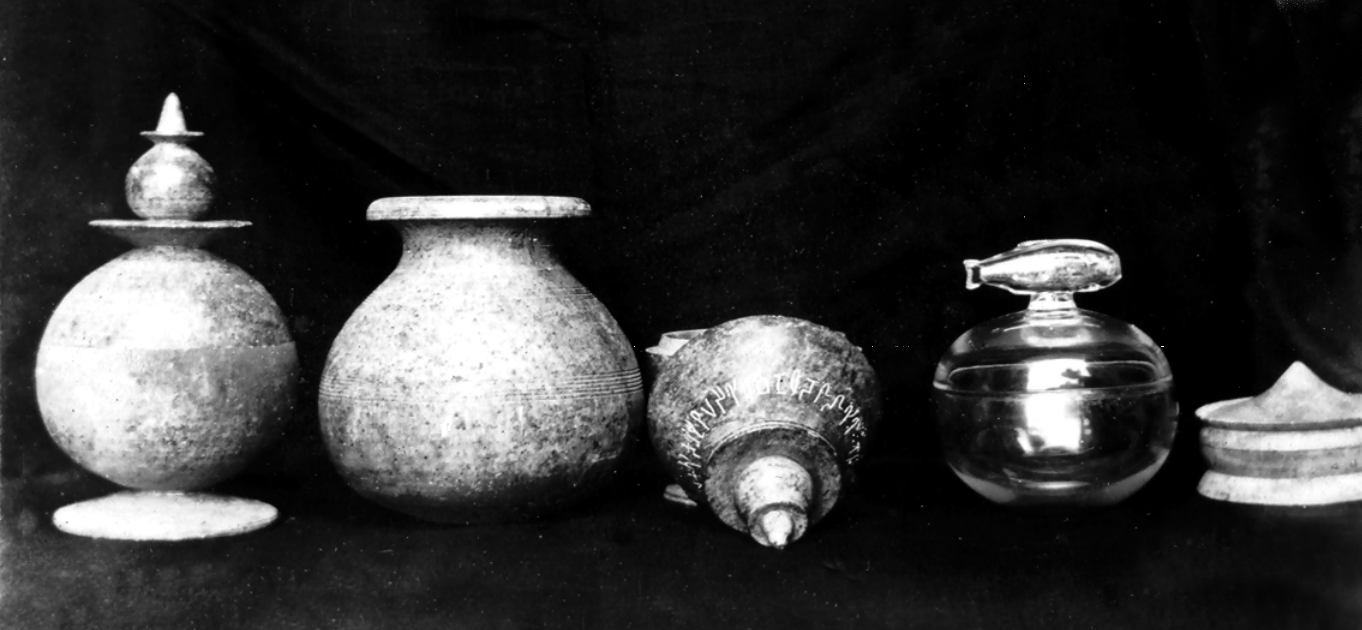
The five reliquaries discovered in Piprahwa

== The inscription ==
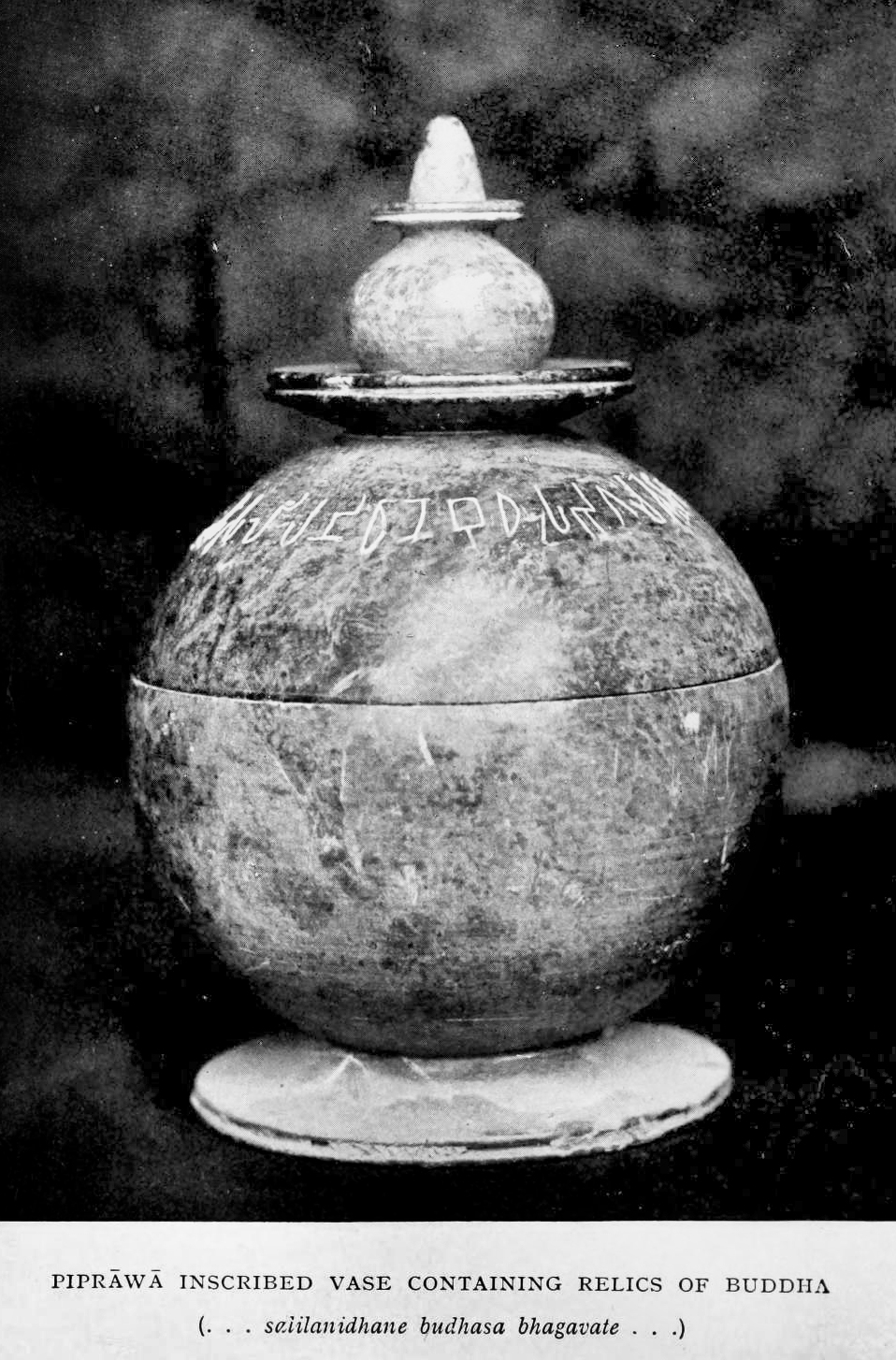
Piprahwa vase with relics of the Buddha. The inscription reads ...salilanidhane Budhasa Bhagavate... "Relics of the Buddha Lord"

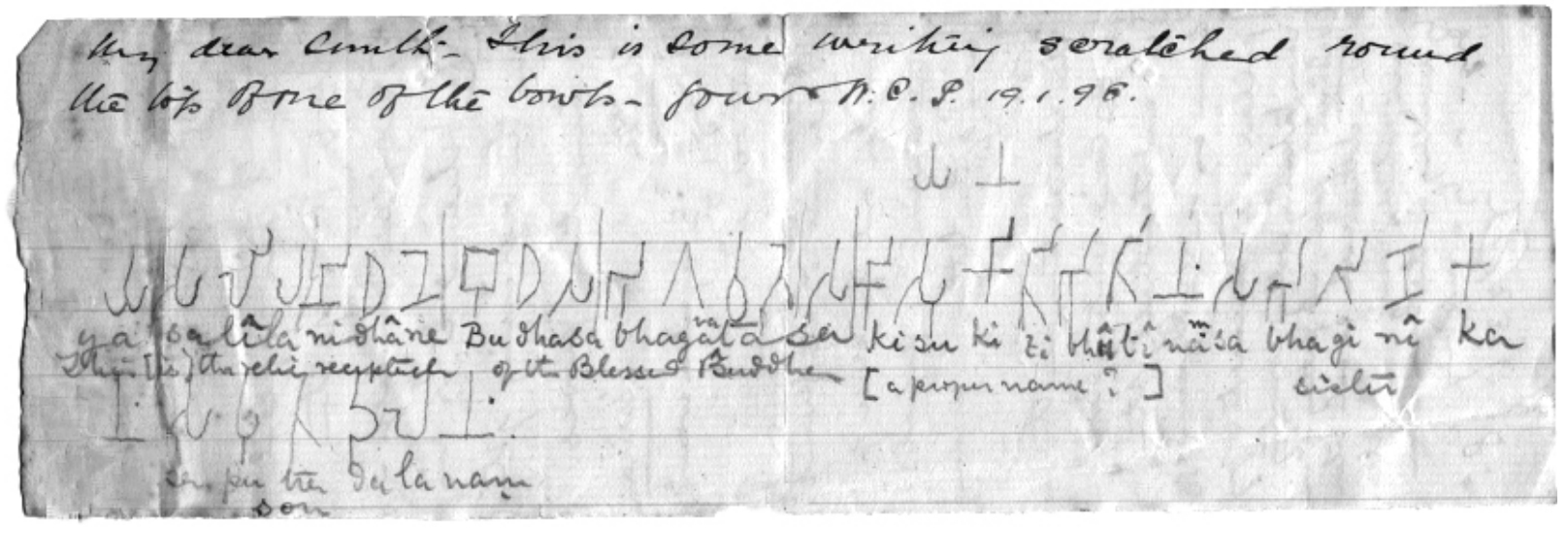
Handwritten note by discoverer W. C. Péppe to Vincent Arthur Smith about the inscription, 1898

On one of the vases was a Brahmi script which was translated by Georg Bühler, a leading European epigraphist of the time, to mean:

"This relic-shrine of divine Buddha (is the donation) of the Sakya-Sukiti brothers, associated with their sisters, sons, and wives."

This translation implied that the bone fragments were part of the remains of Gautama Buddha, the founder of Buddhism. The challenge in interpreting a language that was new to all lay in finding uses of less familiar words in other contexts to reach a definition. To make it harder, the hand copies of the inscription were not always accurate. Peppé's original copy had one minor omission but, when he passed it over to his assistant for more copies, other errors were made. Ambitious Pali scholars approached their translations with a passion that led to competition and grandstanding, often when they were working from different texts. Throughout the following decade or so, epigraphists debated the precise meaning of the inscription. Vincent Smith, William Hoey, Thomas Rhys Davids, and Emile Senart all translated the inscription to confirm that these were relics of the Buddha.

In 1905, John Fleet, a former epigraphist of the Government of India, published a translation that agreed with this interpretation. However, on assuming the role of Secretary of the Royal Asiatic Society from Thomas Rhys Davids, Fleet proposed a different reading:

"This is a deposit of relics of the brethren of Sukiti, kinsmen of Buddha the Blessed One, with their sisters, their children and wives."

This interpretation was firmly rejected by his contemporaries. Following such criticism Fleet wrote: "I now abandon my opinion". It took almost a decade to reach a consensus on the exact meaning of the inscription which resulted in it being subsequently labelled as 'controversial'. Ultimately epigraphists of the time subscribed to the translation by Auguste Barth:

"This receptacle of relics of the blessed Buddha of the Śākyas (is the pious gift) of the brothers of Sukīrti, jointly with their sisters, with their sons and their wives."

Over a hundred years later, in the 2013 documentary, Bones of the Buddha, epigraphist Harry Falk of Freie Universität Berlin confirmed the same interpretation that these were the remains of the Buddha. Having spent time with the reliquary in the Indian Museum in Kolkata, Falk translated the inscription to mean:

'This enshrinement (nidhāna) of the corporal remnants (śarīra) of the Buddha [1: of the Śākyas], the lord, (is to the credit) of the [2: Śākya] brothers of the 'highly famous', together with their sisters, with their sons and wives.'

Where earlier translations had debated the word Sukirti as being either a proper name or a reference to the Buddha as 'possessed of good fame' or 'the well famed one', Falk focuses on the word nidhane. Rather than it simply meaning container or reliquary box, Falk finds evidence to read it as meaning the whole stupa construction installed by the Sakyas for the relics of the Buddha. He concludes that the reliquary found at Piprahwa contained a portion of the ashes of the Buddha and that the inscription is authentic. In the catalogue for the Metropolitan Museum of Art's Tree and Serpent exhibition, Curator John Guy writes that 'it is reasonable to surmise that the Piprahwa bone relics represent the Shakya clan's share of the original division by the Brahmin Drona, as implicit in the reliquary inscription, and that the seven surviving reliquary containers and their precious-material contents represent deposits at the time of the stupa's rebuilding in brick during or shortly after the reign of Ashoka.'

== Dating the reliquary urn and the stupa ==
In 1997, epigraphist and archaeologist Ahmad Hasan Dani noted the challenges that isolated finds present to paleographical study and to dating materials. He concluded that "the inscription may be confidently dated to the earlier half of the second century B.C." but noted that "the Piprahwa vase, found in the Basti District, U.P. (Uttar Pradesh), has an inscription scratched on the steatite stone in a careless manner. As the inscription refers to the remains of the Buddha, it was originally dated to the pre-Mauryan period, but it has been brought down to the third century B.C. on a comparison with Asokan Brahmi". Dani's dating of the inscription puts it around 250 years after the generally agreed 480 BCE death of the historical Buddha which suggests that the 'stupa' itself was built after the Buddha's lifetime. The time difference is most likely explained by the Emperor Asoka's conversion to Buddhism. Asoka the Great was a ruthless and bloody Emperor who ruled from around 268-232 BCE. He supposedly killed his brothers to ascend to the throne but, after the brutality of the Kalinga War where he slaughtered '100,000 men and animals', he renounced all violence and embraced Buddhism. He then issued a decree to build 'stupas' and redistribute the Buddha's remains across his kingdom.

It was not until the 1970s that the evolution of the Piprahwa stupa was established. K. M. Srivastava knew that 'instances are not wanting when relics of the same individual have been enshrined at two different levels'. He led an Archaeological Society of India expedition that dug deeper than Peppé. They discovered two soapstone casket containing fragments of small bone in two burnt brick chambers measuring 32 inches square and 14 inches deep. Some broken dishes that may have covered the caskets proved to be Northern Black Polished Ware which dated this find to 400-500BCE, which is consistent with the 480 BCE date given for the Buddha's passing.

Srivastava concluded that the stupa was built in three phases. The first would have been undertaken by the Sakyas shortly after the Buddha's death. It most likely adhered to the Buddha's instruction to be buried under earth that was 'heaped up as rice is heaped in an alms bowl' and that the stupa be sited beside a crossroads so that passersby might pause to pay their respects and by their veneration gain in understanding and merit. The resulting circular mud adobe structure was 62 ft in diameter and 12 ft in height.

Peppé unearthed the second Asokan phase which was characterized by well fired mud bricks made with rice and straw and laid in clay mortar in concentric circles. The stupa and the coffer it held show all the trademarks of high quality Asokan craftsmanship but the enlargement likely extended for years after the Emperor's death. The base measured 116 ft in diameter and 22 ft in height.

During the third stage of construction the height of the stupa was raised and the base was squared off. Monastic buildings were also constructed around the stupa. This all happened at an unknown date, although most likely during the Kushan era, approximately two hundred and fifty years after the reign of Ashoka.

== Authenticity ==
Although there was initial uncertainty about the translation, there is no record of any challenge to the authenticity of the find itself at the time. However, in introducing the discovery to the members of the Royal Asiatic Society in April 1900, its secretary, Thomas Rhys Davids, stressed that 'the hypothesis of forgery in this case is simply unthinkable'. Over a century later there have been assumptions that such doubts must therefore have existed most likely because government archaeologist, Alois Anton Führer, had been working some eighteen miles away from Peppé on his own dig and was subsequently exposed as a plagiarist and forger. The possibility of forgery was explored by writer and historian Charles Allen in his book The Buddha and Dr. Fuhrer and in his documentary Bones of the Buddha. He researches the unfolding of events at Piprahwa based on the 2008 release of letters between W. C. Peppé, Vincent Smith, and A. A. Führer, and concludes that Führer was unable to interfere with the discovery made by Peppé.

== Distribution of the relics ==
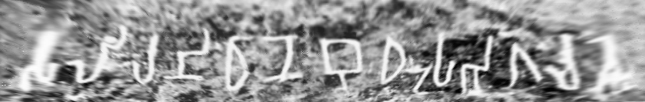
Portion of the Piprahwa vase inscription. The inscription reads Sukiti-bhatinaṃ sabhaginikanam sa-puta-dalanam iyaṃ salila-nidhane Budhasa bhagavate sakiyanam "Relics of the Buddha Lord" (Brahmi script).

Prince Prisdang (aka Jinavaravansa), a former ambassador to Siam and cousin to the King Rama V, had been ordained as a Buddhist monk in Sri Lanka and arrived at Piprahwa shortly after the discovery. He soon learned that W. C. Peppé had placed his finds at the disposal of the government. His eloquent arguments to persuade British government officials to donate the bone relics to the King of Siam to share with Buddhist communities in other countries received support from lower level British officials and worked their way up to the Viceroy. It was an obvious solution that might appease Buddhists who were upset that the recently discovered Bodh Gaya, believed to be the place of the Buddha's enlightenment, had remained under Hindu control. It was also a gesture of goodwill to a country that was being courted by the French, Russian, and Dutch superpowers of the time. In 1899, a ceremony was held and the bone relics were handed to an emissary of King Rama V and taken to Bangkok. Prisdang's request to be involved was not granted.

The bone relics were distributed across several locations, including Golden Mount Temple in Bangkok, Thailand, Shwedagon Pagoda in Rangoon, Myanmar, Arakan pagoda in Mandalay, Myanmar, Dipaduttamarama Temple in Colombo, Sri Lanka, Waskaduwe Vihara in Kalutara, Sri Lanka and the Marichiwatta stupa in Anuradhapura, Sri Lanka.

The majority of the gold and jewellery relic offerings were placed by the Indian government in the Indian Museum, Kolkata. Today, a replica urn is all that is on display. Photographs of the relic offerings can be seen at the Kapilavastu Museum at Piprahwa that is visited by Buddhist pilgrims.

W. C. Peppé was allowed to keep a number of 'duplicate items' which have been exhibited at the Rietberg Museum in Zurich, the Rubin Museum in New York, the Asian Civilizations Museum in Singapore, the Metropolitan Museum of Art in New York and the National Museum of Korea in Seoul. Peppe also gave some pieces to Prince Prisdang and Prisdang's Buddhist master, Sri Subuthi.

On 16 December 2011, a portion of the relics was offered to the Sangha of Ratanawan Monastery. In January, 2012, some of the relics were enshrined in the Buddha Homage Reliquary Hall, Ratanawan Monastery, Thailand. Many senior monks participated in the ceremony including Ajahn Sumedho and Ajahn Viradhammo.

In 2025, Sotheby's auction house in London announced the planned auction of gem relics still remaining in the Peppé family. In May, India took legal measures to prevent their sale; the auction was postponed. In July, the Indian Ministry of Culture said it had recovered the relics in question and would put them in public display.

== Further excavations by the Archaeological Survey of India and the location of ancient Kapilavastu ==
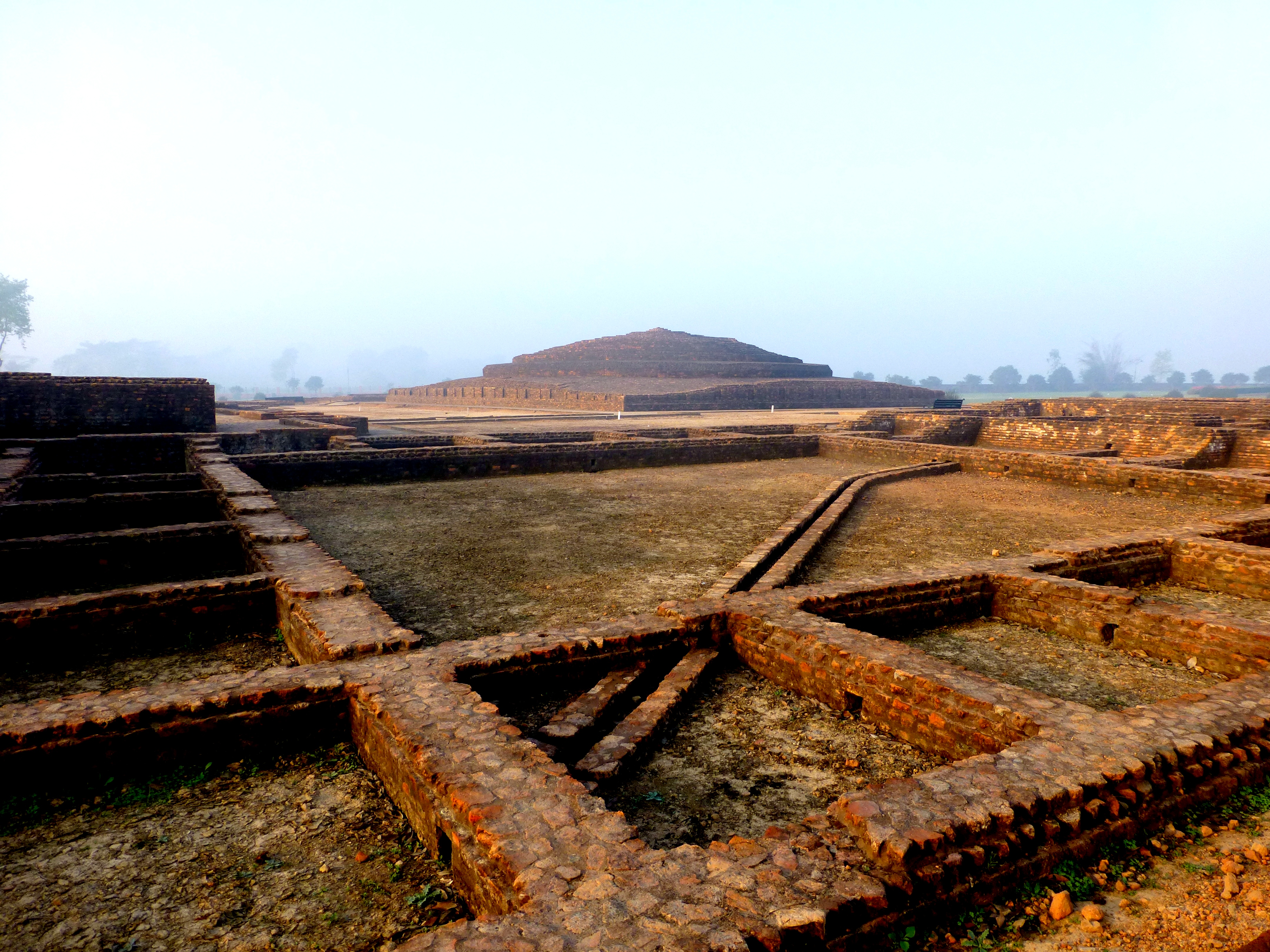
Southern monastery

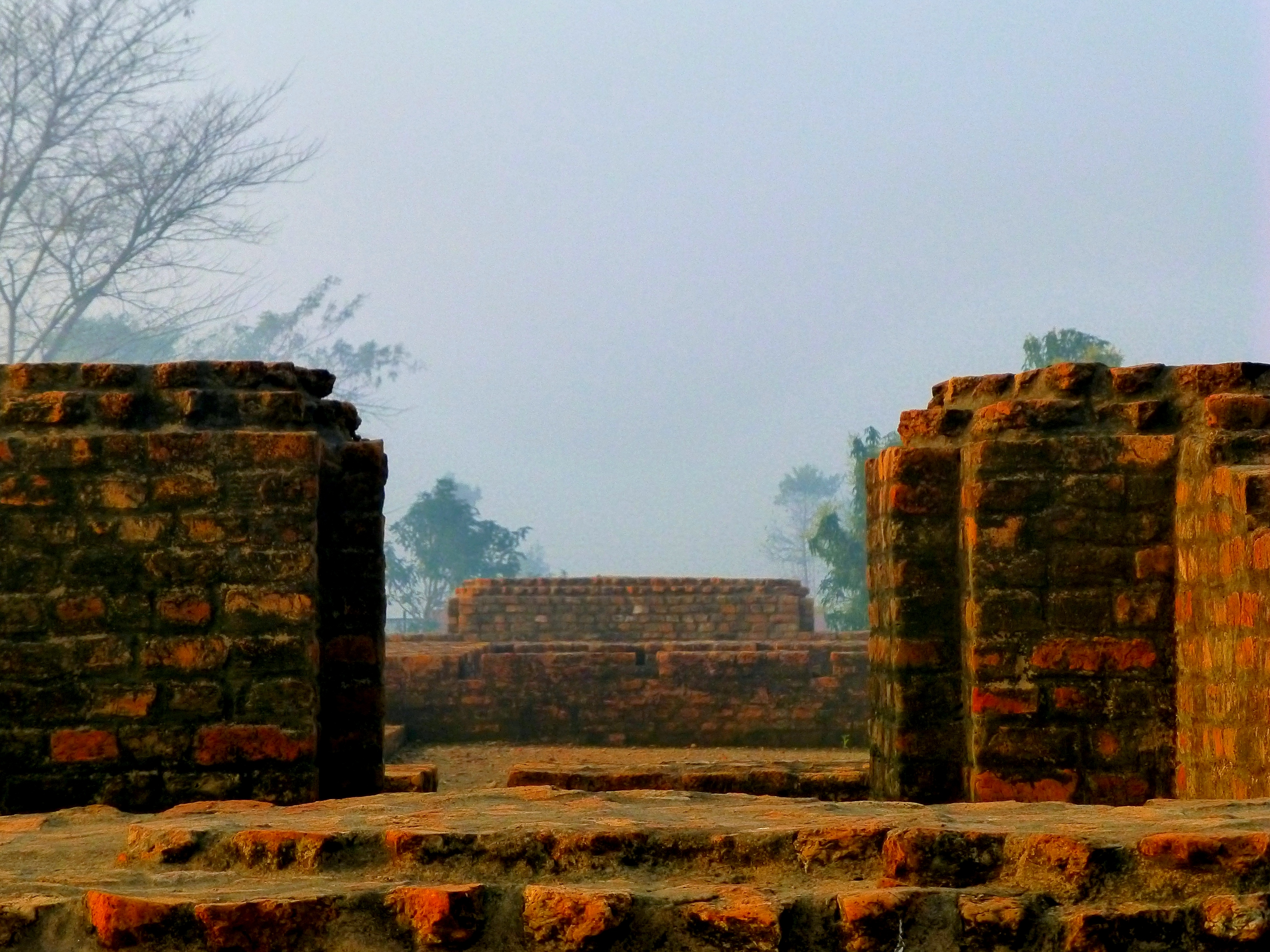
Walls of Building, Kapilavastu

Srivastava continued his excavation of the surrounding area and discovered what is known today as the Piprahwa-Ganwaria monastic complex. The largest structure after the stupa is the Eastern Monastery that measures 45.1 m x 41.1 m with a courtyard and more than thirty cells around it. The complex includes an additional Southern Monastery, Western Monastery, and Northern Monastery. He also found terracotta sealings and a pot which all bore the same legend in Kushan script: 'Of the community of the monks of great Kapilavastu'. This led some scholars to believe that modern-day Piprahwa was the site of the ancient city of Kapilavastu, the capital of the Shakya kingdom, where Siddhartha Gautama spent the first 29 years of his life. Others suggest that the original site of Kapilavastu is located 16 kilometres (9.9 mi) to the northwest, at Tilaurakot, in what is currently Kapilvastu District in Nepal. This question is especially important to scholars of Buddhist history, as Kapilavastu was the capital of the Shakya kingdom. King Śuddhodana and Queen Māyādevī lived at Kapilavastu, as did their son Prince Siddhartha Gautama until he left the palace at 29 years of age.

The bone fragments recovered by Srivastava's team are currently located at the National Museum, New Delhi. In 1978, the Indian government allowed their share of the discovery to be exhibited in Sri Lanka and more than 10 million people paid homage. They were also exhibited in Mongolia in 1993, Singapore in 1994, South Korea in 1995, Thailand in 1996, and again in Sri Lanka in 2012. In February 2024, the bone relics were taken to Bangkok for the first time with the relics of two of the Buddha's disciples, Sariputta and Maha Moggallana from Sanchi in Madhya Pradesh. More than a million people paid their respects between 24 February and 3 March, according to the Ministry of Culture.

== See also ==
- Bhattiprolu
- Bimaran casket
- Relics associated with Buddha
- Sanchi

== Sources ==
- Allen, Charles (2008). The Buddha and Dr Führer: an archaeological scandal (1st ed.). London: Haus Publishing. ISBN 978-1-905791-93-4.
- Allen, Charles (2012), "What happened at Piprahwa: A chronology of events relating to the excavation in January 1898 of the Piprahwa Stupa in Basti District, North-Western Provinces and Oude (Uttar Pradesh), India, and the associated 'Piprahwa Inscription', based on newly available correspondence", Zeitschrift für Indologie und Südasienstudien, 29: 1–19, OCLC 64218646
- Bühler, Georg (April 1898). "Preliminary note on a recently discovered Sakya inscription". Journal of the Royal Asiatic Society of Great Britain and Ireland (Correspondence: Note 14): 387–389. JSTOR 25207982.
- Dani, AH (1997), Indian Palaeography (3rd ed.), New Delhi: Munshiram Manoharlal Publishers, p. 56, ISBN 978-8121500289
- Fleet, J. F. (1907). "The Inscription on the Piprahwa Vase". Journal of the Royal Asiatic Society of Great Britain and Ireland. 39: 105–130. doi:10.1017/S0035869X00035541. JSTOR 25210369. S2CID 250345482.
- Jinavaravansa, P. C.; Jumsai, Sumet (2003). "The Ratna Chetiya Dipaduttamarama, Colombo". Journal of the Royal Asiatic Society of Sri Lanka. New. 48: 213–236. JSTOR 23731479.
- Mishra, S (15 September 2005), "Kalanamak: the future of Indian scented rice?", Down To Earth magazine, New Delhi: Society for Environmental Communications
- Peppe, WC (July 1898), "The Piprahwa Stupa, containing relics of Buddha", With a Note by V.A. Smith. Journal of the Royal Asiatic Society of Great Britain and Ireland (Article XXIII): 573–88, JSTOR 25208010
- Sharda, Shailvee (4 May 2015), "UP's Piprahwa is Buddha's Kapilvastu?", Times of India
- Smith, V. A. (Oct., 1898), The Piprāhwā Stūpa, Journal of the Royal Asiatic Society of Great Britain and Ireland, p. 868
- Srivastava, KM (1979), "Kapilavastu and Its Precise Location", East and West, 29 (1/4): 61–74, JSTOR 29756506
- Srivastava, KM (1980). "Archaeological Excavations at Piprāhwā and Ganwaria and the Identification of Kapilavastu". The Journal of the International Association of Buddhist Studies. 13 (1): 103–110.
- Srivastava, KM (1996). Excavations at Piprahwa and Ganwaria (Memoirs of the Archaeological Survey of India No 94) (PDF). New Delhi: Archaeological Survey of India.
- Srivathsan, A (20 August 2012), "Gautama Buddha, four bones and three countries", Colombo Telegraph, Colombo, Sri Lanka
- Tuladhar, Swoyambhu D. (November 2002), "The Ancient City of Kapilvastu - Revisited" (PDF), Ancient Nepal (151): 1–7, archived from the original (PDF) on 9 January 2016
