= Tilaurakot =

Village in Lumbini Province, Nepal

Tilaurakot तिलौराकोट
- Archeological Site
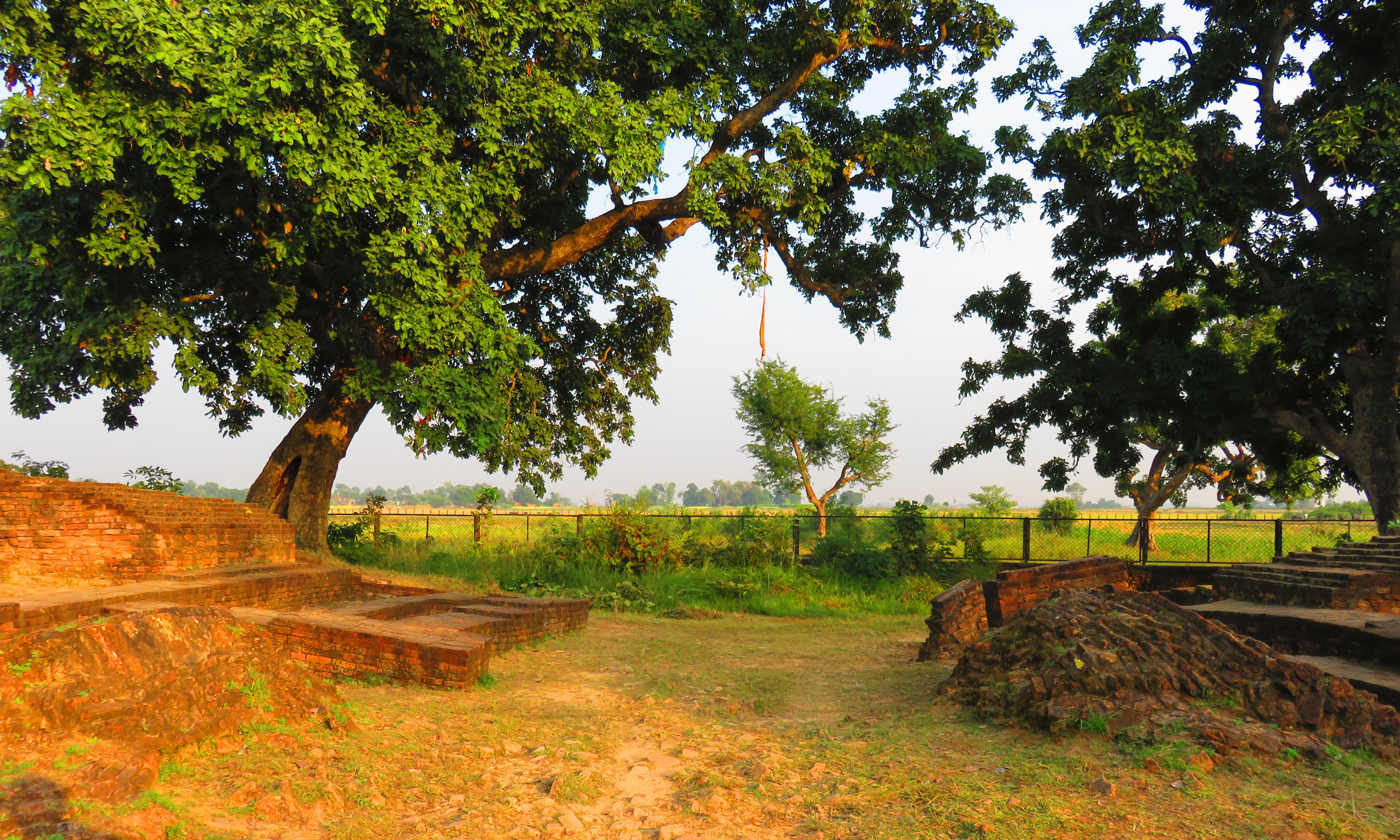
- The east gate at the Tilaurakot archaeological site.

- Location in Province Tilaurakot (Nepal) Tilaurakot (South Asia)
- Coordinates: 27.58°N 83.08°E
- Country: Nepal
- Province: Lumbini Province
- District: Kapilvastu District
- Municipality: Kapilvastu Municipality

Population (1991)
  - Total: 5,684
- Time zone: UTC+5:45 (Nepal Time)

Protected Ancient Monument
- Law: Ancient Monuments Preservation Act, 2013 (1956)
- ID: NP-KV-01

Tilaurakot is a neighborhood in Kapilvastu Municipality in Kapilvastu District, in the Lumbini Province of southern Nepal. Previously it was a Village development committee. At the time of the 1991 Nepal census it had a population of 5684 people living in 944 individual households. It is situated 25 kilometers (15.5 mi) northwest of the Maya Devi Temple in Lumbini, and 4.5 kilometers (2.8 mi) southeast of Nigali Sagar in Nigalihawa.

Tilaurakot may be the location of the ancient Shakyan city of Kapilavastu, where Gautama Buddha spent the first 29 years of his life. The site was listed as a UNESCO tentative site in 1996 by the Nepalese government.

== Location ==
Tilaurakot is located about 27 km west of Lumbini, on the bank of the Banaganga river.

== Description ==
Tilaurakot represents one of the best-preserved early historic city sites in South Asia.

The basic site consists of a fortified "citadel" covering an area of 500x400 m, with various associated monuments in the surrounding area. The city was built according to a regular grid plan, with streets running north-south and east-west. Several open areas within this area have also been found; these may have been town squares.

The site was surrounded by an earthen wall that was later converted to brick. This outer wall was double on the south and east sides. The city walls were built on top of an earlier wooden palisade, which has been dated to the 6th century BCE. The palisades were built on a regular plan, indicating that ancient Tilaurakot was a pre-planned town from this phase onward. Sediments from the Banaganga have been found in the earliest layers of the settlement, indicating that the early settlement at Tilaurakot experienced significant flooding; the palisade may have been built in an attempt to control the flooding.

At the centre of the ancient city was a second, inner walled complex, measuring over 100x100 m. The walls served to separate this inner complex from the surrounding city. Later monuments were built on top of some parts of the old walls. This central walled complex may represent the large central walled monument that Faxian and Xuanzang recorded in Kapilavastu.

Archaeologists have found monumental gateways on the north and west sides of the central walled complex. There was apparently also a gate on the east side, but it has not been found because its expected location was covered up by later building activity. On the south wall, directly across from the north gate, was a monumental tower.

About 220 m southeast of the city's eastern gate (the outer wall, not the inner complex) was a mound which Mukherji excavated and identified as a brick stupa, about 1.82 m tall. This stupa was remodelled multiple times in antiquity, and its relics had also been removed in ancient times. Archaeologists have not been able to determine when the stupa was originally built. To the southeast of this stupa were two large tanks, now silted up.

Another monument was located to the south of the main site, on the northern outskirts of the present town of Tauliva. It is now represented by a large mound on the west side of the road, with another modern shrine to Samai Mai on top. Mukherji identified this as another stupa but did not excavate here.

Mukherji also found a large mound of iron slag on the edge of the ditch just south of the citadel, which he interpreted as the site of an ancient workshop. This site is called Lohasariya. Excavations in 2012 uncovered 9 tons of iron slag, which was radiocarbon dated to a period beginning around 400 BCE.

On the west side of the citadel, close to the western gate, Mukherji record two low mounds and a large brick foundation, which he interpreted as the remains of a Buddhist vihara.

To the north of the citadel, Mukherji recorded the remains of a northern suburb, surrounded by a ditch for protection.

== Dating ==
According to Babu Krishna Rijal, the finds at Tilaurakot can be dated to a period from around 1000 BCE to the 3rd century CE. Rijal divided the site's chronology into five different stages: period I, dated to around 1100-800 BCE and associated with the Painted Grey Ware culture; period II, dated to around 600-500 BCE and associated with the Northern Black Polished Ware culture; period III, identified with the Maurya period (more pottery associated with the Northern Black Polished Ware culture has also been dated to this period, along with some inscriptions in the Brahmi script); period IV, dated to the Shunga period; and finally period V, dated to the Kushan period.

The earliest radiocarbon dated layers at Tilaurakot, corresponding to a period of early agricultural activity, date to 620 BCE (with a margin of error of 170 years). The first phase of urban occupation has been radiocarbon dated to about 570 BCE (with a margin of error of 130 years). The town's earthen wall has been radiocarbon dated to about 450 BCE, with a margin of error of 130 years.

== History of study ==
The site of Tilaurakot was "first noted as a place of archaeological interest" in 1896 by Alois Anton Führer, who was the archaeological surveyor for the British government of the North West Provinces and Oudh. The first excavation took place in 1899 by P. C. Mukherji, working for the Archaeological Survey of India. Mukherji recognised what was then a mound covered by woods as the remains of a rectangular fort surrounded by a wall and ditch.

Mukherji was convinced that Tilaurakot represented the site of ancient Kapilavastu, and cited several pieces of geographic evidence in support of this. He also identified specific structures at Tilaurakot with places mentioned in ancient texts, although these have been disputed. His general identification of Tilaurakot with Kapilavastu has also been disputed, with other scholars suggesting Piprahwa or Ganwaria instead, but a majority of scholars have generally agreed with his identification of Tilaurakot with Kapilavastu.

After Mukherji's initial excavation, further archaeological work was not done at Tilaurakot until 1962, when a joint Nepalese and Indian team led by Debala Mitra dug a small trench on the northwest side of the citadel.

The Nepalese Department of Archaeology conducted further research between 1967 and 1972, and a Japanese team from Rissho University also conducted excavations between 1967 and 1977, although their results were never translated into Nepali or English.

Work under UNESCO was done in 1997 and 1999, led by Robin Coningham and Kosh Prasad Acharya; this provided the first radiocarbon dating of the site and challenged the later date that Mitra had proposed earlier.

In 2012 and 2013, further excavations were undertaken by the Nepal Department of Archaeology in tandem with the Lumbini Development Trust and Durham University. In 2012, they dug a trench at Lohasariya, about 100 m south of Tilaurakot, and in 2013 they re-excavated Mitra's old trench.

== History ==
The 19th-century search for the historical site of Kapilavastu followed the accounts left by Faxian and later by Xuanzang, who were Chinese Buddhist monks who made early pilgrimages to the site. Some archaeologists have identified the Tilaurakot archeological site as the location for the historical site of Kapilavastu, while others claim it was 16 km away at Piprahwa in the Indian state of Uttar Pradesh.

Tilaurakot was discovered by PC Mukherji in 1899 tracing the journey of those two Chinese monks following the history, they were visited Tilaurakot in the 3rd and 6th centuries AD. Archeologists believe that it was the civic center from 9th century BC to 3rd Century AD. Experts have discovered the palaces, temples, monuments, sculptures, ponds, roads and some believe that the place was the capital of Shakya Kingdom and home town of Buddha. Some of the objects found during the excavation are kept in Kapilvastu Museum near the Tilaurakot which is being displayed for the visitors.

== UNESCO Tentative Listed Site ==
Archaeological excavation is still going on as of now at Tilaurakot and it is believed by some to be the ancient palace of King Suddhodhana, father of Buddha. Three palaces believed to be that of King Suddhodama are being explored by excavation. It was listed as a UNESCO tentative site in 1996 by the Nepalese government.

== Tourism ==
The visitor books at Tilaurakot do not usually record domestic tourists from Nepal and India, so data about visitors from those two countries is limited. Most international tourist visits to Tilaurakot come from countries with large Buddhist populations. As of 2017, about 50% of all international tourists to Tilaurakot came from Myanmar. About 20% were from Thailand, and about 5% were from Vietnam.

There were a total of 36,982 visitors to Tilaurakot recorded in 2017, in 1,091 groups. (Again, this excludes many visitors from Nepal and India, who are mostly unrecorded.)

The bulk of visits to Tilaurakot are between October and March. The fewest visits are during the summer, during the monsoon season.
