= Julius Jolly =

Julius Jolly may refer to:

- Julius Jolly (Indologist) (1849–1932), German academic and Indologist
- Julius Jolly (politician) (1823–1891), German politician
