= Hermann Jacobi =

German Indologist (1850–1937)

- Born: 11 February 1850
- Died: 19 October 1937 (aged 87)
- Occupation: Indologist

Hermann Georg Jacobi (11 February 1850 – 19 October 1937) was a German Indologist.

== Education ==
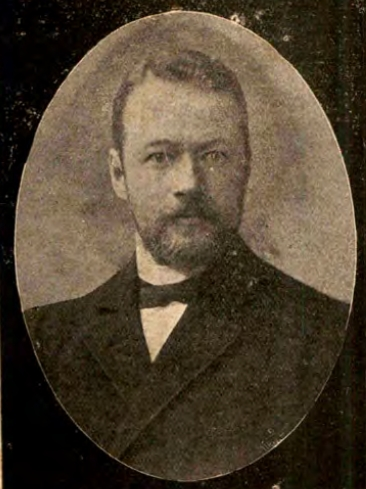

Jacobi was born in Köln (Cologne) on 11 February 1850. He was educated in the gymnasium of Cologne and then went to the University of Berlin, where initially he studied mathematics, but later, probably under the influence of Albrecht Weber, switched to Sanskrit and comparative linguistics, which he studied under Weber and Johann Gildemeister. He obtained his doctorate from the University of Bonn. The subject of his thesis, written in 1872, was the origin of the term "hora" in Indian astrology.

Jacobi was able to visit London for a year, 1872–1873, where he examined the Indian manuscripts available there. The next year, with Georg Bühler, he visited Rajasthan, India, where manuscripts were being collected. At Jaisalmer Library, he came across Jain manuscripts, which were of abiding interest to him for the rest of his life. He later edited and translated many of them, both into German and English, including those for Max Mueller's Sacred Books of the East.

== Academic appointments ==
In 1875 he completed his habilitation and became a docent in Sanskrit at Bonn; from 1876-85 he was professor extraordinarius of Sanskrit and Comparative Philology at Münster, Westphalia; in 1885, he was appointed professor ordinarius of Sanskrit at Kiel; and in 1889 was appointed professor of Sanskrit at Bonn. He served as professor in Bonn until his retirement in 1922. After his retirement, Jacobi remained active, lecturing and writing till his death in 1937.

== Work ==
Apart from Jaina studies, Jacobi was interested in Indian mathematics, astrology and the natural sciences, and using astronomical information available in the Vedas, he tried to establish the date of their composition. Like Alexander Cunningham before him he tried to systematise how, from the evidence available in inscriptions, a true local time could be arrived at.

Jacobi's studies in astronomy have regained importance today in the context of the Out of India theory, because his calculations led him to believe that the hymns of the Rigveda were to be dated as early as 4500 B.C. Thus he is the only renowned Western Indologist whose research supports the claim of the proponents of the theory that the Vedas are to be dated back much earlier than the first half of the second millennium B.C. According to mainstream Indology, the Indo-Aryan Migration took place during this period of time and the Vedas were only composed after the migration. When Jacobi published his views in an article on the origin of Vedic culture in the Journal of the Royal Asiatic Society (1908), he therefore triggered a major controversy in Indology.

In his later life, Jacobi focused on poetry, epics, and philosophy, particularly the school of Nyaya-Vaisheshika.

== Honors ==
Among the honours he received was a doctorate from the University of Calcutta where he had gone in the winter of 1913-14 to lecture on poetics, while the Jain community conferred the title Jain Darshan Divakar — Sun of the Jain doctrine — upon him. He became an international honorary member of the American Academy of Arts and Sciences in 1909.

== Publications (selection) ==
- Zwei Jainastotras (1876)
- Jaina Sutras, Part I (1884) (Ākārāṅga Sūtra and Kalpa Sūtra)
- Jaina Sutras, Part II (1895) (Uttarādhyayana and Sūtrakritāṅga)
- Ausgewählte Erzählungen in Maharashtri (i.e. Selected tales of the Maharashtri), Hirzel (1886)
- The Computation of Hindu Dates in the Inscriptions, Epigraphia Indica, 1 (1892), 403-460
- Das Ramayana, Geschichte und Inhalt nebst Concordanz nach den gedruckten Rezensionen, Verlag Friedrich Cohen (1893)
- Compositum und Nebensatz, Studien über die indogermanische Sprachentwicklung, Verlag Friedrich Cohen (1897)
- Mahābhārata: Inhaltsangabe, Index und Concordanz der Calcuttaer und Bombayer Ausgaben, Verlag Friedrich Cohen (1903)
- On the Antiquity of Vedic Culture (1908)
- Schriften zur indischen Poetik und Ästhetik (i.e. Writings on Indian poetics and aesthetics), Wissenschaftliche Buchgesellschaft (1969)
- Die Entwicklung der Gottesidee bei den Indern und deren Beweise für das Dasein Gottes (i.e. The development of the Indians' idea of God and their proofs for God's existence), Kurt Schroeder Verlag (1923)
- Über das ursprüngliche Yogasystem (i.e. About the original system of Yoga, 1929 / 1930)
