= Willibald Kirfel =

German Indologist

Willibald Kirfel (29 January 1885 – 16 October 1964) was a German Indologist. He is known for his scholarly work on Indian cosmography, medicine and religion.

== Biography ==
Kirfel studied Indology in Bonn from 1904 – 1908 and worked as a librarian at the university library, before becoming a full professor, acceding to the chair of his teacher Hermann Jacobi.

Even at an early stage he dedicated himself to his most important field of research, i.e. the cosmography of the Brahmins, Jainas and Buddhists. In 1920 he published his postdoctoral thesis titled The Cosmography of the Indians, which was published as a reprint in 1967.

Kirfel also studied intensively the Puranas, especially focussing on those passages which appear in numerous texts in different variants. The result of his research was published in his title Das Purânapancalakshana. Versuch einer Textgeschichte (The Puranapancalakshana. Attempt at a textual history.). He wrote many more articles on Puranic subjects as well as books on the symbolism of Hinduism, Buddhism and Jainism. Together with H. Hilgenburg, he also translated the Ashtângahridayasamhitâ, an important treatise on medicine.

== Literature ==
- Valentina Stache-Rosen: German Indologists. Biographies of scholars in Indian studies written in German. Max Mueller Bhavan, New Delhi 1981.

== Works ==
- Die Kosmographie der Inder, nach den Quellen dargestellt (1920)
- Die Religion der Jaina's (1928)
- Bhâratavarsa (Indien) (1931)
- Der Hinduismus (1934)
- Kultur der orientalischen Völker (1936) with Erich Schmitt, Oskar Kressler and others
- Ashtanga Hridaya Samhita (1941), translator with Luise Hilgenberg
- Die dreikopfige Gottheit. Archaeologisch-ethnologischer Streifzug durch die Ikonographie der Religionen (1948)
- Der Rosenkranz (1949)
- Symbolik des Buddhismus (1959)
- Symbolik des Hinduismus und des Jinismus (1959)
- Zur Eschatologie von Welt und Leben. Ein puranischer Text nebst Übertragung in textgeschichtlicher Darstellung (1959)
