= Georg Bühler =

German scholar of ancient Indian languages and law

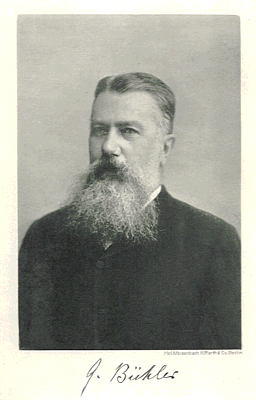
- Georg Bühler

Professor Johann Georg Bühler (19 July 1837 – 8 April 1898) was a German scholar of ancient Indian languages and law.

== Early life and education ==
Bühler was born to Rev. Johann G. Bühler in Borstel, Hanover, attended grammar school in Hanover, where he mastered Greek and Latin, then university as a student of theology and philosophy at Göttingen, where he studied classical philology, Sanskrit, Zend, Persian, Armenian, and Arabic. In 1858 he received his doctorate in eastern languages and archaeology; his thesis explored the suffix -tês in Greek grammar. That same year he went to Paris to study Sanskrit manuscripts, and in 1859 onwards to London, where he remained until October 1862. This time was used mainly for the study of the Vedic manuscripts at the India Office and the Bodleian Library at Oxford University. While in England, Bühler was first a private teacher and later (from May 1861) assistant to the Queen's librarian in Windsor Castle.

== Academic career ==
In Fall 1862 Bühler was appointed assistant at the Göttingen library; he moved there in October. While settling in, he received an invitation via Prof. Max Müller to join the Benares Sanskrit College in India. Before this could be settled, he also received (again via Prof. Müller) an offer of Professor of Oriental Languages at the Elphinstone College, Bombay (now Mumbai). Bühler responded immediately and arrived in Bombay on 10 February 1863. Noted Sanskrit and legal scholar Kashinath Trimbak Telang was then a student at the college. In the next year Bühler became a Fellow of Bombay University and member of the Bombay Branch of the Royal Asiatic Society. He was to remain in India until 1880. During this time he collected a remarkable number of texts for the Indian government and the libraries of Berlin, Cambridge University, and Oxford University.

In the year 1878 he published his translations of the Paiyalachchhi, the oldest Prakrit dictionary, with glossary and translation. He also took responsibility for the translation of the Apastamba, Dharmasutra etc. in Professor Max Müller's monumental compilation and translation, the Sacred Books of the East, vols. 2, 14, and 25.

In 1880 he returned to Europe and taught as a professor of Indian philology and archaeology at the University of Vienna, where he worked until the end of his life. On 8 April 1898 Bühler drowned in Lake Constance, under somewhat mysterious circumstances. Contemporary accounts mostly attributed it to an accident, but it has been speculated that it was a suicide motivated by Bühler's connections to a scandal involving his former student Alois Anton Führer.

== Selected publications ==
- Prakrit dictionary Paiyalacchinamamala ("Beiträge zur Kunde der indogermanischen Sprachen", Göttingen 1878)
- Erklärung der Ashokainschriften ("Zeitschrift der deutschen morgenländischen Gesellschaft", 1883–1893)
- The roots of the Dhatupatha not found in literature ("Wiener Zeitschrift für die Kunde des Morgenlandes", 1894)
- On the origin of the Kharosthi alphabet (ibid. 1895)
- Digest of Hindu law cases (1867–1869; 1883)
- Panchatantra with English notes ("The Bombay sanscrit series", 1868; 1891)
- Apastambiya Dharmasutra (1868–1871; 1892–1894)
- Catalogue of Sanskrit manuscripts from Gujarat (4 vol., 1871–1873)
- Dachakumaracharita, with English notes ("Sanscrit series" no. 10, 1873, 1887; II, with P. Peterson)
- Vikramankacharita with an introduction (1875)
- Detailed report of a tour in Kashmir (1877)
- Sacred laws of the Aryas (I, 1879; II, 1883; vols. 2 and 14, "The Sacred Books of the East")
- Third book of sanscrit (1877; 1888)
- Leitfaden für den Elementarcursus des Sanskrit (1883)
- Inscriptions from the caves of the Bombay presidency ("Archaeological reports of Western India", 1883)
- Paleographic remarks on the Horrinzi palmleaf manuscript ("Anecdota oxoniensia", 1884)
- The laws of Manu translated ("The Sacred Books of the East", vol. 25, 1886)
- Translation of the Dhauli and Jaugada versions of the Ashoka edicts ("Archaeological reports of Southern India", vol. I, 1887)
- On the Origin of the Indian Brahma Alphabet (German 1895, English 1898)

In the Schriften der Wiener Akademie der Wissenschaften:

- Über eine Sammlung von Sanskrit- und Prakrit-Handschriften (1881)
- Über das Zeitalter des Kashmirischen Dichters Somadeva (1885)
- Über eine Inschrift des Königs Dharasena von Valabhi (1886)
- Über eine neue Inschrift des Gurjara königs Dadda II (1887)
- Über eine Sendrakainschrift
- Über die indische Sekte der Yainas
- Über das Navasahasankacharita des Padmagupta (1888, with Th. Zachariae)
- Über das Sukrtasamkirtana des Arisimha (1889)
- Die indischen Inschriften und das Alter der indischen Kunstpoesie (1890)
- Indian studies: I. The Jagaducarita of Sarvananda, a historical romance from Gujarat (1892); II. Contributions to the history of the Mahabharata (with J. Kirste); III. On the origin of the Brahmi alphabet (1895)

== Bibliography ==
- Kirfel, Willibald (1955), Bühler, Johann Georg. In: Neue Deutsche Biographie (NDB) Vol. 2, Berlin: Duncker & Humblot, ISBN 3-428-00183-4, S. 726 f.
- Winternitz, Moritz (1903), Bühler, Georg. In: Allgemeine Deutsche Biographie, Vol. 47, Leipzig: Duncker & Humblot, pp. 339–348.
- Jolly, Julius (1899). Georg Bühler 1837 - 1898, Grundriss der Indo-Arischen Philologie und Altertumskunde, 1. Band, 1. Heft, A; Strassburg : Trübner
- Natu, Amruta Chintaman (2020), . Georg Bühler's Contribution to Indology, In: Harvard Oriental Series: Opera Minora, Piscataway: Gorgias Press, pp. 255.
