= Sacred Books of the East =

English translations of Asian religious texts (1879–1910 Max Müller, editor)

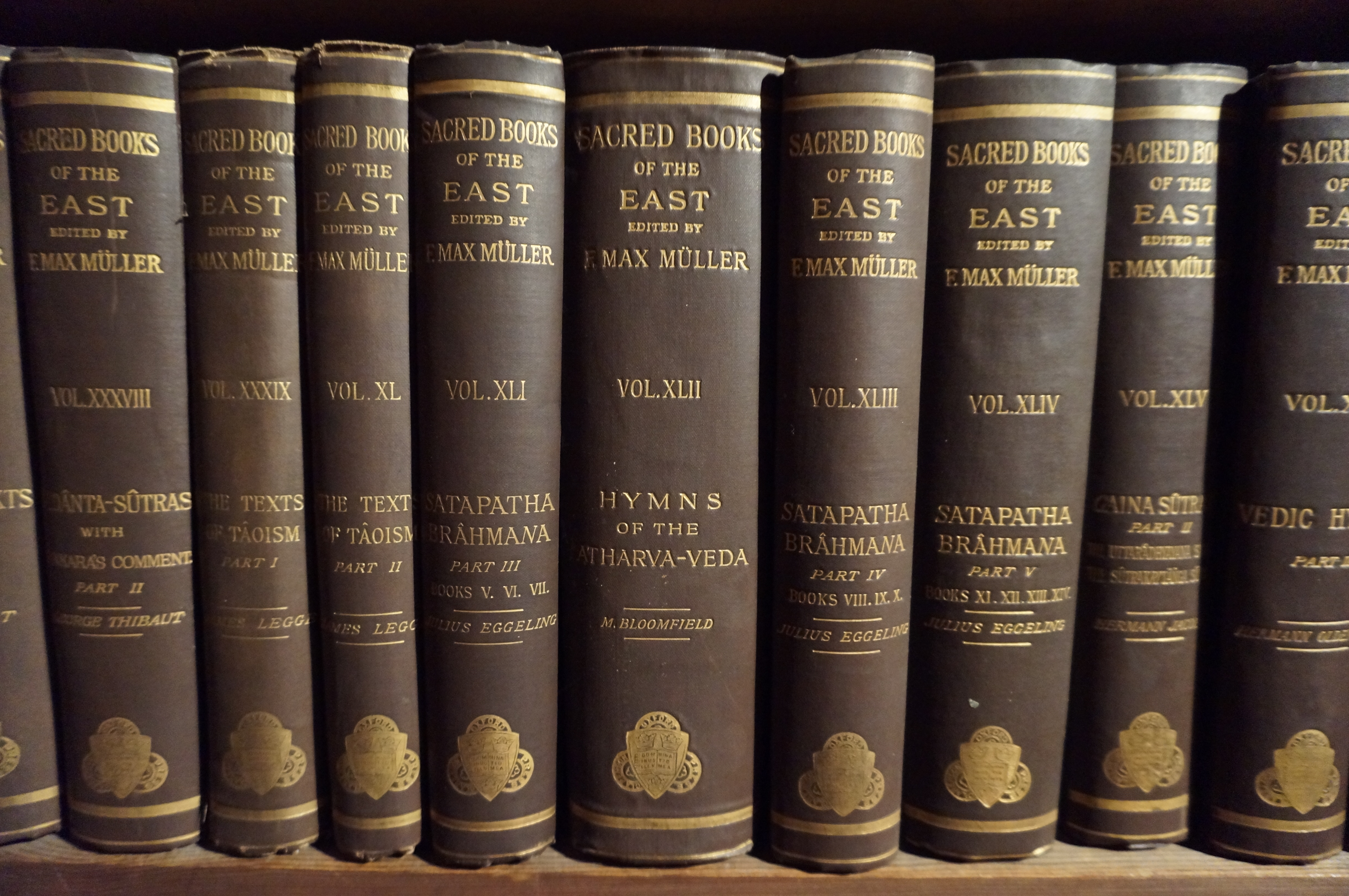
Sacred Books of the East

The Sacred Books of the East is a monumental 50-volume set of English translations of Asian religious texts, edited by Max Müller and published by the Oxford University Press between 1879 and 1910. It incorporates the essential sacred texts of Hinduism, Buddhism, Taoism, Confucianism, Zoroastrianism, Jainism, and Islam.

All of the books are in the public domain in the United States, and most or all are in the public domain in many other countries. Electronic versions of all 50 volumes are widely available online.

== List ==
Volumes of the Sacred Books of the East
Vol.	Title and contents	Group	Translator	Published
1	The Upanishads, part 1/2: Khândogya Upanishad; Talavakâra or Kena-Upanishad; Aitareya-Âranyaka; Kaushîtaki-Brâhmana; Vâjasaneyi-Sâmhita Upanishad	Hindu	Max Müller	1879
2	The Sacred Laws of the Âryas (Dharmaśāstra), part 1/2: Âpastamba; Gautama; Vâsishtha; Baudhâyana	Hindu	Georg Bühler	1879
3	The Sacred Books of China, part 1/6 – the texts of Confucianism: The Shû King (Classic of History); Book of Thang; Books of Yü; Books of Hsiâ; Books of Shang; Books of Kâu; Shih King, the Book of Odes (Classic of Poetry); I. Odes of the Temple and the Altar; II. Minor Odes of the Kingdom; III. Major Odes of the Kingdom; IV. Lessons from the States; The Hsiâo King (Classic of Filial Piety)	China	James Legge	1879
4	Zend-Avesta, part 1/3: Vendîdâd	Zor	James Darmesteter	1880
5	Pahlavi Texts, part 1/5: Bundahis; selections of Zâd-sparam; Bahman Yast; Shâyast lâ-Shâyast	Zor	E. W. West	1880
6	Qur'an part 1/2 – chapters I-XVI	Islam	E. H. Palmer	1880
7	The Institutes of Visnu.	Hindu	Julius Jolly	1880
8	The Bhagavadgîtâ: Sanatsugâtîya; Anugîtâ.	Hindu	Kâshinâth Trimbak Telang	1882
9	The Qur'an, part 2/2 – chapters XVII-CXIV	Islam	E. H. Palmer	1880
10	Dhammapada: a collection of verses Sutta-Nipâta: a collection of discourses, one of the canonical books of the Buddhists	Bud	Max Müller (Dhammapada from Pāli, Sutta-Nipata from Pāli)	1881
11	Buddhist Suttas: Mahā-parinibbāṇa Suttanta; Dhamma-kakka-ppavattana Sutta; Tevigga Sutta'anta; Âkankheyya Sutta'a; Ketokhila Sutta'a; Mahâ-Sudassana Sutta'anta; Sabbâsava Sutta'a	Bud	T. W. Rhys Davids	1881
12	Satapatha Brahmana, part 1/5: Mâdhyandina Shakha I-II	Hindu	Julius Eggeling	1882
13	Vinaya Texts, part 1/3: Pāṭimokkha; Mahâvagga, I–IV.	Bud	T. W. Rhys Davids and Hermann Oldenberg	1881
14	The Sacred Laws of the Âryas, part 2/2: Vâsishtha; Baudhâyana; Parisishta	Hindu	Georg Bühler	1882
15	The Upanishads, part 2/2: Katha Upanishad; Mundaka Upanishad; Taittiriya Upanishad; Brhadaranyaka Upanishad; Svetasvatara Upanishad; Prasña Upanishad; Maitrayani Upanishad	Hindu	Max Müller	1884
16	The Sacred Books of China, part 2/6 – the texts of Confucianism: Yi King (I Ching).	China	James Legge	1882
17	Vinaya Texts, part 2/3: Mahavagga, V–X; Kullavagga, I–II	Bud	T. W. Rhys Davids and Hermann Oldenberg	1882
18	Pahlavi Texts, part 2/5: Dâdistân-î Dinik; Epistles of Mânûskîhar	Zor	E. W. West	1882
19	The Fo-sho-hing-tsan-king: a life of Buddha, by Ashvaghosha, Bodhisattva; translated from Sanskrit into Chinese by Dharmakṣema (A. D. 420).	Bud	Samuel Beal	1883
20	Vinaya Texts, part 3/3: Kullavagga, IV–XII.	Bud	T. W. Rhys Davids and Hermann Oldenberg	1885
21	The Saddharma-Pundarika or The Lotus of the True Law.	Bud	H. Kern	1884
22	Jaina Sûtras, part 1/2: Âkârânga Sûtra; Kalpa sûtra	Jain	Hermann Jacobi from the Prâkrit	1884
23	Zend-Avesta, part 2/3: Sîrôzahs; Yasts; Nyâyis	Zor	James Darmesteter	1883
24	Pahlavi Texts, part 3/5: Dinai Mainög-i khirad; Sikand-Gümanik Vigar; Sad Dar	Zor	E. W. West	1884
25	The Laws of Manu: with extracts from seven commentaries.	Hindu	Georg Bühler	1886
26	Satapatha Brahmana, part 2/5: Mâdhyandina Shakha III–IV	Hindu	Julius Eggeling	1885
27	The Sacred Books of China, part 3/6 – the texts of Confucianism: The Lî Kî I (Book of Rites)	China	James Legge	1885
28	The Sacred Books of China, part 4/6 – the texts of Confucianism: The Lî Kî Ii (Book of Rites)	China	James Legge	1885
29	Grihya-sutras, part 1/2 – rules of Vedic domestic ceremonies: Sankhyayana-Grihya-sutra; Āśvalāyana-Grihya-sutra; Paraskara-Grihya-sutra; Khadia-Grihya-sutra	Hindu	Hermann Oldenberg	1886
30	Grihya-sutras, part 2/2 – rules of Vedic domestic ceremonies: Gobhila; Hiranyakesin; Apastamba; Yajña Paribhashasutras	Hindu	Hermann Oldenberg (Apstamba), Max Müller (Yajna)	1892
31	Zend-Avesta, part 3/3: Yasna; Visparad; Afrînagân; Gâhs; miscellaneous fragments	Zor	Lawrence Heyworth Mills	1887
32	Vedic Hymns, part 1/2: Hymns to the Maruts; Hymns to Rudra; Hymns to Vâyu; Hymns to Vâta; Bibliographical list of the more important publications on the Rigveda	Hindu	Max Müller	1891
33	The Minor Law-Books: Brihaspati	Hindu	Julius Jolly	1889
34	Vedanta-Sutras, part 1/3: Commentary by Sankaracharya, part 1 of 2; Adhyâya I–II (Pâda I–II).	Hindu	George Thibaut	1890
35	The Questions of King Milinda, part 1/2: Milindapañha	Bud	T. W. Rhys Davids	1890
36	The Questions of King Milinda, part 2/2: Milindapañha	Bud	T. W. Rhys Davids	1894
37	Pahlavi Texts, part 4/5: Contents of the Nasks	Zor	E. W. West	1892
38	Vedanta-Sutras, part 2/3: Commentary by Sankaracharya, part 2 of 2; Adhyâya II (Pâda III–IV)–IV	Hindu	George Thibaut	1896
39	Texts of Taoism, part 1/2: Tâo Teh King (Tâo Te Ching) of Lâo Dze (Lao Tsu); The Writings of Kwang-tze (Chuang-tse), I–XVII	China	James Legge	1891
40	Texts of Taoism, part 2/2: The Writings of Kwang Tse, XVII–XXXIII; The Thâi-shang tractate of actions and their retributions (Treatise on the Response of the Tao); Other Taoist texts; the Index to vols. 39 and 40	China	James Legge	1891
41	Satapatha Brahmana, part 3/5: Mâdhyandina Shakha V–VII	Hindu	Julius Eggeling	1894
42	Hymns of the Atharvaveda, Together With Extracts From the Ritual Books and the Commentaries	Hindu	Maurice Bloomfield	1897
43	Satapatha Brahmana, part 4/5: Mâdhyandina Shakha VII, IX, X.	Hindu	Julius Eggeling	1897
44	Satapatha Brahmana, part 5/5: Mâdhyandina Shakha XI–XIV.	Hindu	Julius Eggeling	1900
45	Jaina Sûtras, part 2 of 2: Uttarâdhyayana Sûtra; Sûtrakritânga Sûtra	Jain	Hermann Jacobi (from Prâkrit)	1895
46	Vedic Hymns, part 2/2: Hymns to Agni (Mandalas I–V)	Hindu	Hermann Oldenberg	1897
47	Pahlavi Texts, part 5/5: Marvels of Zoroastrianism	Zor	E. W. West	1897
48	Vedanta-Sutras, part 3/3, with the commentary of Râmânuja	Hindu	George Thibaut	1904
49	Buddhist Mahâyâna Texts, part 1/2: Buddha-karita of Aśvaghoṣa; Buddhist Mahâyâna Texts, part 2/2: Longer Sukhâvatî-vyûha; Shorter Sukhâvatî-vyûha; Vagrakkhedikâ; the longer Pragñâ-pâramitâ-hridaya-sûtra; the shorter Pragñâ-pâramitâ-hridaya-sûtra; Amitâyur dhyâna-sûtra	Bud	Edward Byles Cowell (part 1, from Sanskrit), Max Müller, and Takakusu Junjiro (Amitâyur)	1894
50	General index to the names and subject-matter of the Sacred Books of the East.	Index	Moriz Winternitz, with a preface by Arthur Anthony Macdonell	1910
