= Hermann Oldenberg =

German Indologist

- Hermann Oldenberg
- Born: 31 October 1854; Hamburg, Germany
- Died: 18 May 1920 (aged 65)
- Occupations: Orientalist, Indologist

Hermann Oldenberg (31 October 1854 – 18 March 1920) was a German scholar of Indology, and Professor at Kiel (1898) and Göttingen (1908).

== Work ==
Oldenberg was born in Hamburg. His 1881 study on Buddhism, entitled Buddha: Sein Leben, seine Lehre, seine Gemeinde, based on Pāli texts, popularized Buddhism and has remained continuously in print since its first publication. With T. W. Rhys Davids, he edited and translated into English three volumes of Theravada Vinaya texts, two volumes of the (Vedic) Grhyasutras and two volumes of Vedic hymns on his own account, in the monumental Sacred Books of the East series edited by Max Müller. With his Prolegomena (1888), Oldenberg laid the groundwork to the philological study of the Rigveda.

In 1919 he became a foreign member of the Royal Netherlands Academy of Arts and Sciences.

He died in Göttingen.

== Selected publications ==
- Oldenberg, Hermann, Die Religion des Veda. Berlin 1894; Stuttgart 1917; Stuttgart 1927; Darmstadt 1977
- Oldenberg, Hermann, trans. Müller, Max, ed. Vedic Hymns, part 2: Hymns to Agni. The Sacred Books of the East, vol. 46, Oxford, Clarendon Press 1897. Reprint: Low Price Publications 1996, ISBN 8175360321.
- Oldenberg, Hermann, trans./ed. "The Dîpavaṃsa: An Ancient Buddhist Historical Record, London: Williams and Norgate 1879.
- Oldenberg, Hermann. Buddha: his life, his doctrine, his order, London, Williams 1882.
- Oldenberg, Hermann, trans., Max Müller, ed. Sacred Books of the East Vol. XXIX, "The Grihya-sûtras, rules of Vedic domestic ceremonies", part 1, Oxford, The Clarendon press 1886
- Oldenberg, Hermann, trans. Müller, Max, trans. Sacred Books of the East Vol. XXX, "The Grihya-sûtras, rules of Vedic domestic ceremonies", part 2, Oxford, The Clarendon press 1892
- Rhys Davids, T. W.; Oldenberg, Hermann, trans. (1881–85). Vinaya Texts, Sacred Books of the East, volumes XIII, XVII & XX, Clarendon/Oxford. Reprint: Motilal Banarsidass, Delhi (Dover, New York) Vol. XIII, Mahavagga I-IV, Vol. XVII, Mahavagga V-X, Kullavagga I-III, Vol. XX, Kullavagga IV-XII
