= Sahajaśrī =

14th-century Indian Buddhist monk

- Born: Kapilavastu
- Died: 1381

Sahajaśrī (d. 1381) was a fourteenth-century Indian Buddhist monk notable for his activities in Ming China during the later period of his life.

The main source of his life is a biography written by his disciple, Zhiguang. Sahajaśrī was born in the city of Kapilavastu which was associated with the life of the Buddha. Historically Kapilavastu was linked with the region of "Central India" and Chinese sources refer to him as being a native of “the country of Kapilavastu, in Central India”. At an early age he travelled followed a group of sramanas to Kashmir where he was ordained as a monk at a monastery that has been recorded in Chinese sources as Su-luo-sa. Among the topics he was educated in were the "pañcavidyā" (five traditional sciences) and the Buddhist canons. It was said that even experienced monks could not defeat him in debates. Becoming disillusioned with the state of his knowledge, he travelled from Kashmir to China to go on a pilgrimage to Mount Wutai to worship the bodhisattva Manjushri.

On his way to China, he travelled through the countries of Kucha and Qocho and after four years he reached Gansu in Western China. The Yuan emperor, Toghon Temür heard of his impending arrival, and he sent officials to take him to the capital, Khanbaliq in 1364. He therefore missed another Indian Buddhist monk in the Yuan court, Dhyānabhadra, by one year as he died in 1363. When the Yuan dynasty collapsed in 1368, Sahajaśrī moved to Nanjing and he officially entered the Ming court in 1371 with the Hongwu Emperor gifting him silver and titles. He was also granted the title; shànshì chánshī (The Chan Master who betters the world) which was the highest title among the Buddhist monks at the time and therefore granted him significant authority. Sahajaśrī was respected by the Mongol and Tibetan subjects of the Hongwu Emperor hence Sahajaśrī's role helped to strengthen Ming control over them. In 1376, he was permitted to visit Mount Putuo, a sacred place in Chinese Buddhism linked with the Bodhisattva Guanyin. Sahajaśrī died in 1381 after which a number of his disciples (but not all) were granted permission to return to India.
