= Vincent Arthur Smith =

Irish historian, art historian and indologist (1843–1920)

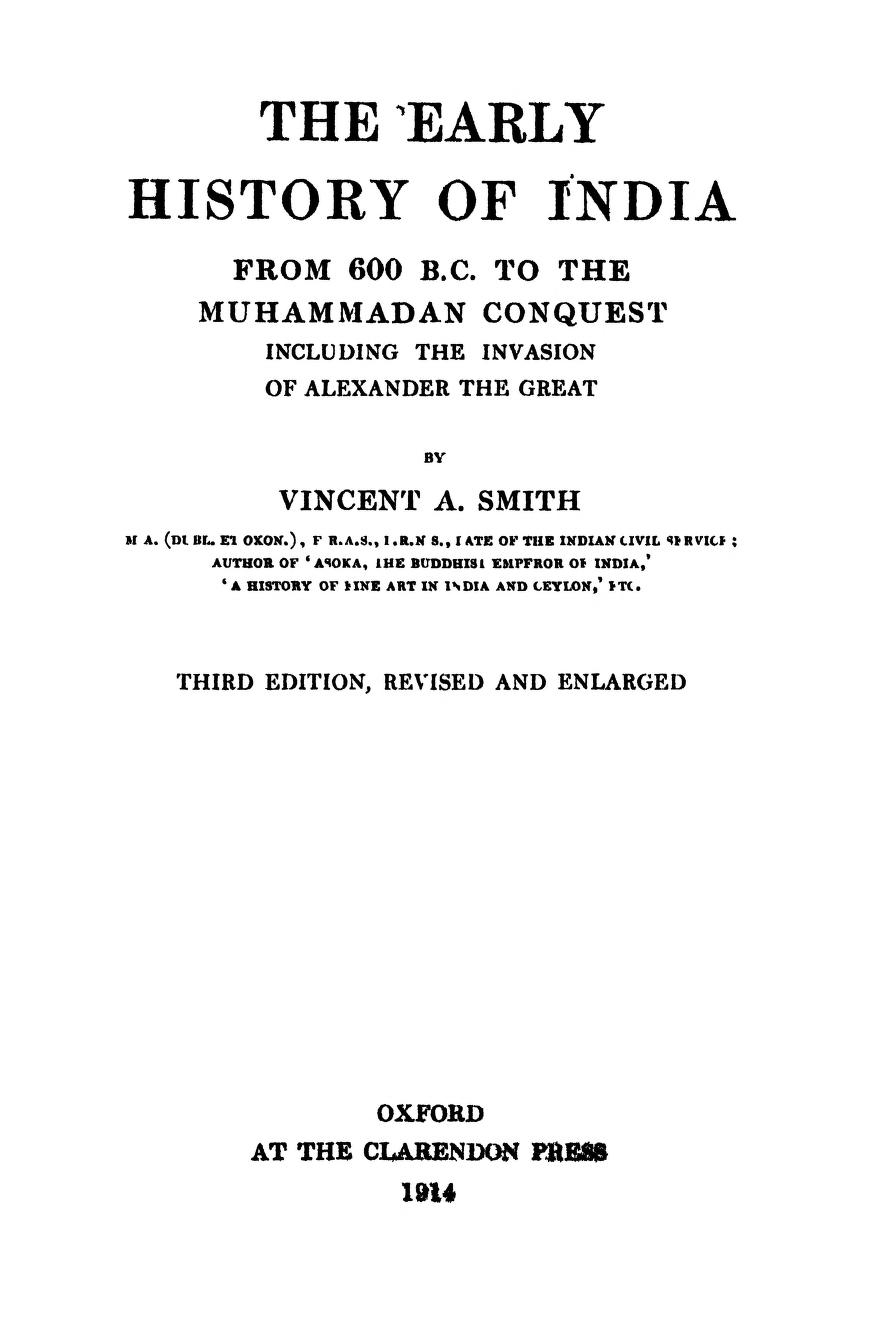
- The Early History of India by Vincent Arthur Smith, 1914
- Born: 3 June 1843; Dublin, United Kingdom of Great Britain and Ireland
- Died: 6 February 1920 (aged 76); Oxford
- Occupations: Indologist, art historian

Vincent Arthur Smith CIE (3 June 1843 – 6 February 1920) was an Irish Indologist, historian, member of the Indian Civil Service, and curator. He was one of the prominent figures in Indian historiography during the British Raj.

In the 1890s, he was key to exposing the forgeries of Alois Anton Führer, then working for the Archaeological Survey of India, who Smith caught in the act of making fake inscriptions.

== Biography ==
Smith was born in Dublin on 3 June 1843 which was then part of the United Kingdom of Great Britain and Ireland. His father was Aquilla Smith, well known in medical and numismatic circles in Dublin and London.

After graduating from Trinity College Dublin, he passed the final examination for the Indian Civil Service in 1871, at "the head of the list", and served in what is now Uttar Pradesh until 1900, in the regular ICS roles, rising to the post of Chief Secretary to the government in 1898, becoming a Commissioner the same year. Throughout this period he was a prolific writer on Indian history, and finally left the service early to devote more time to this, in 1900, returning to England.

Moving first to Cheltenham, by 1910 Smith was settled in Oxford where he joined St John's College and was appointed a Curator of the Indian Institute.

Following his retirement, Smith wrote several monographs on Indian history. These included two monographs on the emperors Ashoka and Akbar respectively, which he went on to revise several times, updating them to reflect new research and information. He also wrote and published two comprehensive volumes on Indian history, The Early History of India and The Oxford History of India, as well as a book about the history of fine arts in India and Sri Lanka.

Smith was honoured with the award of Companion of the Order of the Indian Empire and awarded a doctorate by Trinity College Dublin in 1919.

He died in Oxford on 6 February 1920.

== Works ==
- General index to the reports of the Archaeological Survey of India: Volumes I to XXIII, with a glossary and general table of contents, Simla, Government Central Press, 1887. - Varanasi: Indological Book House, 1969
- Smith, Vincent Arthur (1893). Editor of William Henry Sleeman's Rambles and Recollections of an Indian official Volume 1, Rambles and Recollections of an Indian official Volume 2 Westminster Reprint edition of the 1893 (2 volumes)
- Preface to Purna Chandra Mukherji: A report on a tour of exploration of the antiquities of Kapilavastu Tarai of Nepal during February and March, 1899, Calcutta: Office of the Superintendent of Government Printing, 1901; Delhi Indological Book House, 1969.
- Smith, Vincent Arthur (1901). Asoka, the Buddhist Emperor of India, 1 ed. Oxford 1901; 3rd ed., Rulers of India series, Oxford : Clarendon Press, 1920
- Smith, Vincent Arthur (1901). The Jain Stûpa and other antiquities of Mathurâ
- "The Kushān, or Indo-Scythian, Period of Indian History, B.C. 165 to A.D. 320," pp. 1–64 in Journal of the Royal Asiatic Society (London), 1903.
- Smith, Vincent Arthur (1903). The Indian civil service as a profession. A lecture delivered at Trinity College, Dublin, on June 10th, 1903
- Smith, Vincent Arthur (1904). The Early History of India, from 600 B. C. to the Muhammadan conquest. A revised fourth edition (1924) was edited by Stephen Edwardes.
- Smith, Vincent Arthur (1906). Catalogue of the coins in the Indian Museum, Calcutta, including the cabinet of the Asiatic Society of Bengal: Volume 1, The Early Foreign Dynasties and the Guptas, Oxford: Clarendon Press
- Smith, Vincent Arthur (1906). Williams Jackson, A. V. (ed.). History of India: From Sixth century B.C. to Mohammedan Conquest. Vol. 2. London: Grolier Society.
- Smith, Vincent Arthur (1911). A history of fine art in India and Ceylon from the earliest times to the present day, First Edition
- A history of fine art in India and Ceylon from the earliest times to the present day, Second Edition revised by K Codrington, 1930
- A history of fine art in India and Ceylon from the earliest times to the present day, Third Edition revised and enlarged by Karl Khandalavala, 1962
- Smith, Vincent Arthur (1917). Akbar the Great Mogul, 1542-1605. Oxford: Clarendon Press.
- Smith, Vincent Arthur (1919) Second and revised edition to François Bernier's Travels in the Mogul Empire, AD 1656–1668, 1914
- Smith, Vincent Arthur (1919). The Oxford history of India: from the earliest times to the end of 1911, Oxford: Clarendon Press. The second edition (1923) was edited by Stephen Edwardes.
- Smith, Vincent Arthur (1919). Indian constitutional reform, viewed in the light of history, Oxford: University Press
