= Kapilavastu (ancient city) =

Ancient city in the Indian subcontinent

Kapilavastu

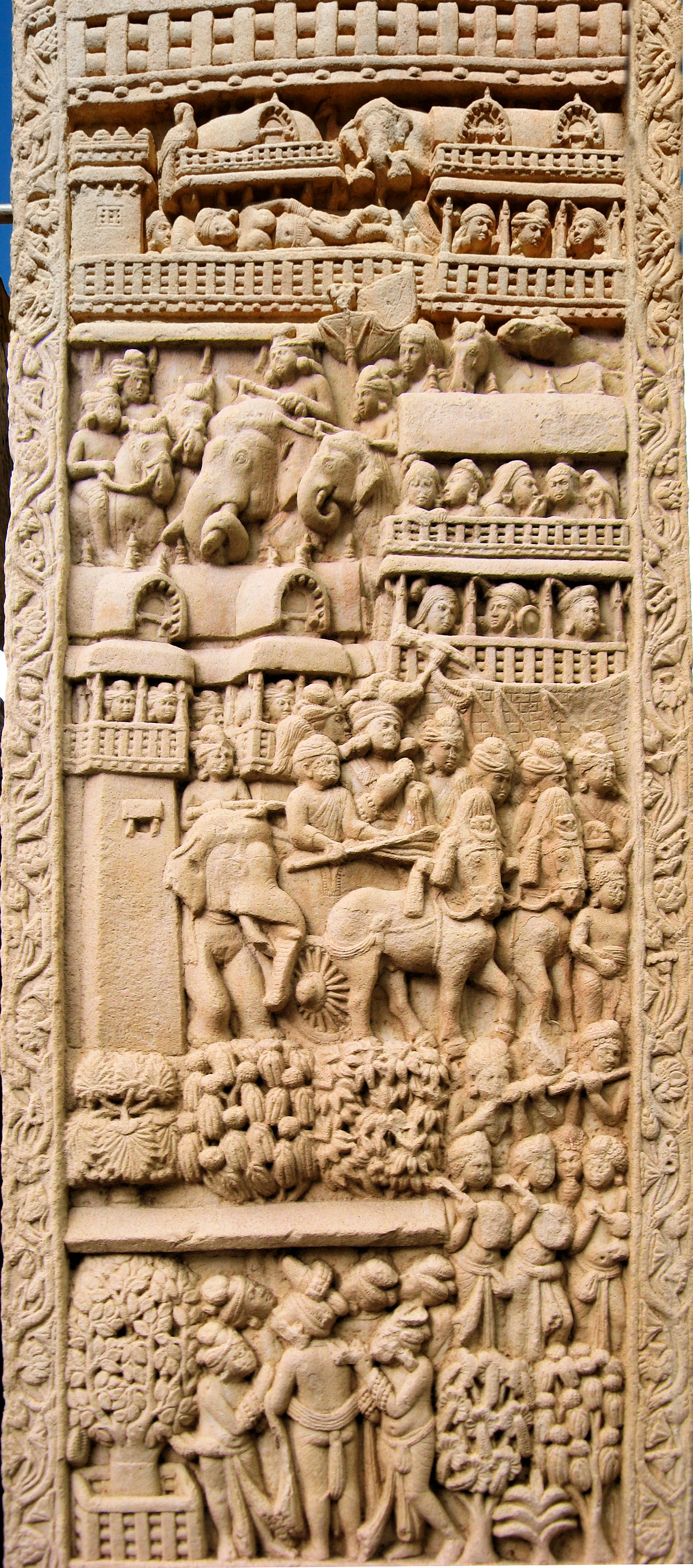
Procession of king Suddhodana from Kapilavastu, proceeding to meet his son the Buddha walking in mid-air (head raised at the bottom of the panel), and to give him a Banyan tree (bottom left corner). The dream of Maya at the top of the panel is a sure marker of Kapilavastu. Sanchi.

Proposed location of Kapilavastu, in Tilaurakot and Piprahwa, in South Asia.
Proposed location of Kapilavastu, in Tilaurakot and Piprahwa, each on a different side of the India-Nepal frontier.

Kapilavastu was an ancient city in the eastern Gangetic plains of the Indian subcontinent which was the capital of the clan gaṇasaṅgha or "republic" of the Shakyas in the late Iron Age, around the 6th and 5th centuries BC. King Śuddhodana and Queen Māyā are believed to have lived at Kapilavastu, as did their son Prince Siddhartha Gautama (Gautama Buddha) until he left the palace at the age of 29.

Buddhist texts such as the Pāli Canon say that Kapilavastu was the childhood home of Gautama Buddha, on account of it being the capital of the Shakyas, over whom his father ruled. Kapilavastu is the place where Siddhartha Gautama spent the first 29 years of his life. Buddhists sources state that the city of Kapilavastu was built in honour of Kapila and the Buddha was Kapila in one of his previous lives. According to Buddhist sources the name Kapilvatthu means "tawny area", due to the abundance of reddish sand in the area. Most foreign accounts from the medieval period, particularly from China, described Kapilavastu as being part of "Central India".

Kapilavastu never became a major pilgrimage site like Buddha's birthplace at Lumbini not far away, which would have left unmistakable remains. The settlement was probably never as large as depictions in early Buddhist art suggest, and after the decline of Buddhism in India its location faded into obscurity. There are now two sites near the border between Nepal and India which are claimed as Kapilavastu — Piprahwa in Uttar Pradesh, India and Tilaurakot in Nepal. Finds at the Piprahwa (including a reliquary found inside a mud stupa) indicate Buddhist activity dating to the 5th–4th century BCE, around the time of the death of the Buddha.

== Search for Kapilavastu ==
The 19th-century search for the historical site of Kapilavastu followed the accounts left by Faxian and later by Xuanzang, who were Chinese Buddhist monks who made early pilgrimages to the site. Some archaeologists have identified present-day Tilaurakot, Nepal, while others have identified present-day Piprahwa, India as the location for the historical site of Kapilavastu, the seat of governance of the Shakya state that would have covered the region. Both sites contain archaeological ruins. Those at Piprahwa show it was a significant early Buddhist site with a stupa and monasteries, and probably relics of the Buddha.

== Proposed sites ==
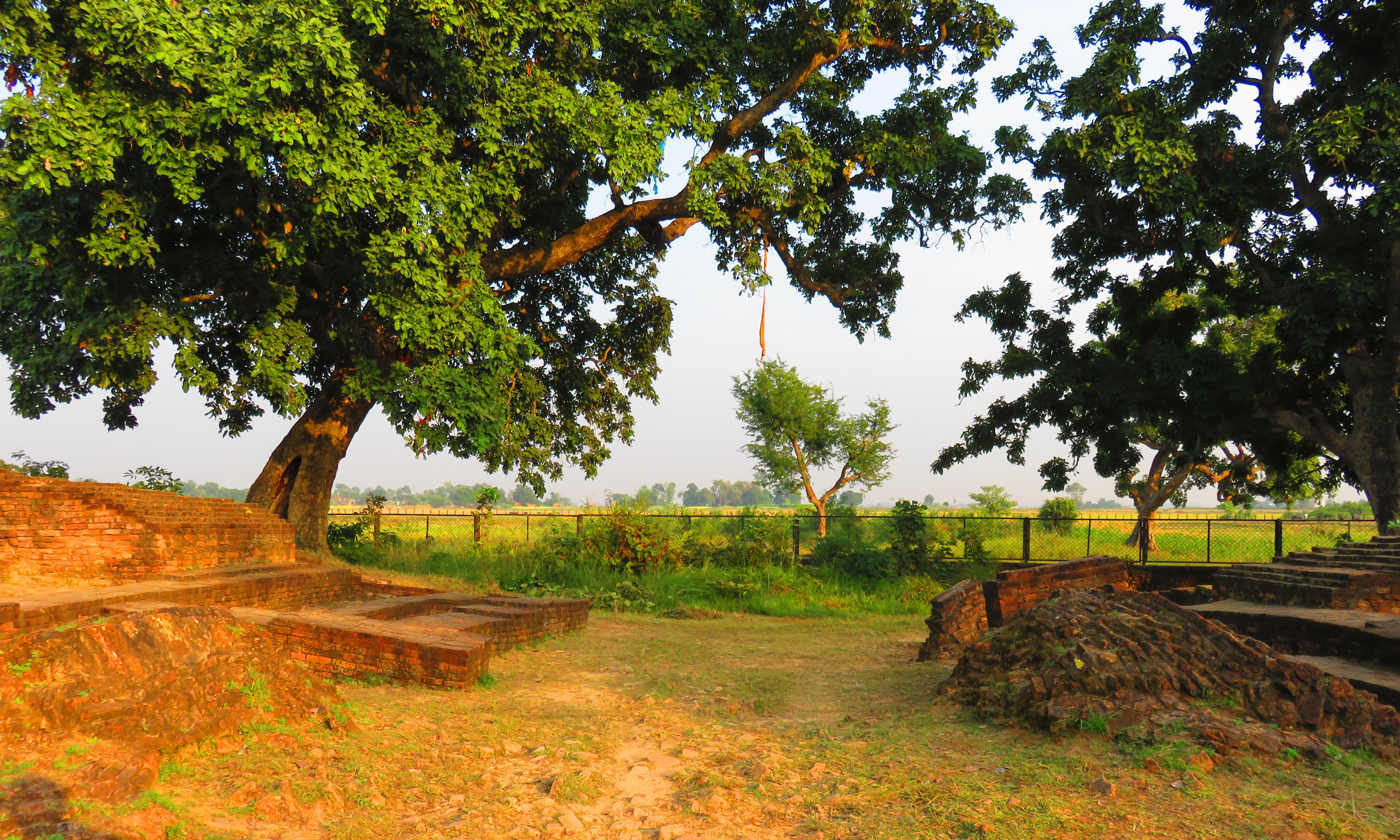
Proposed site of Suddhodanda's Palace at Tilaurakot

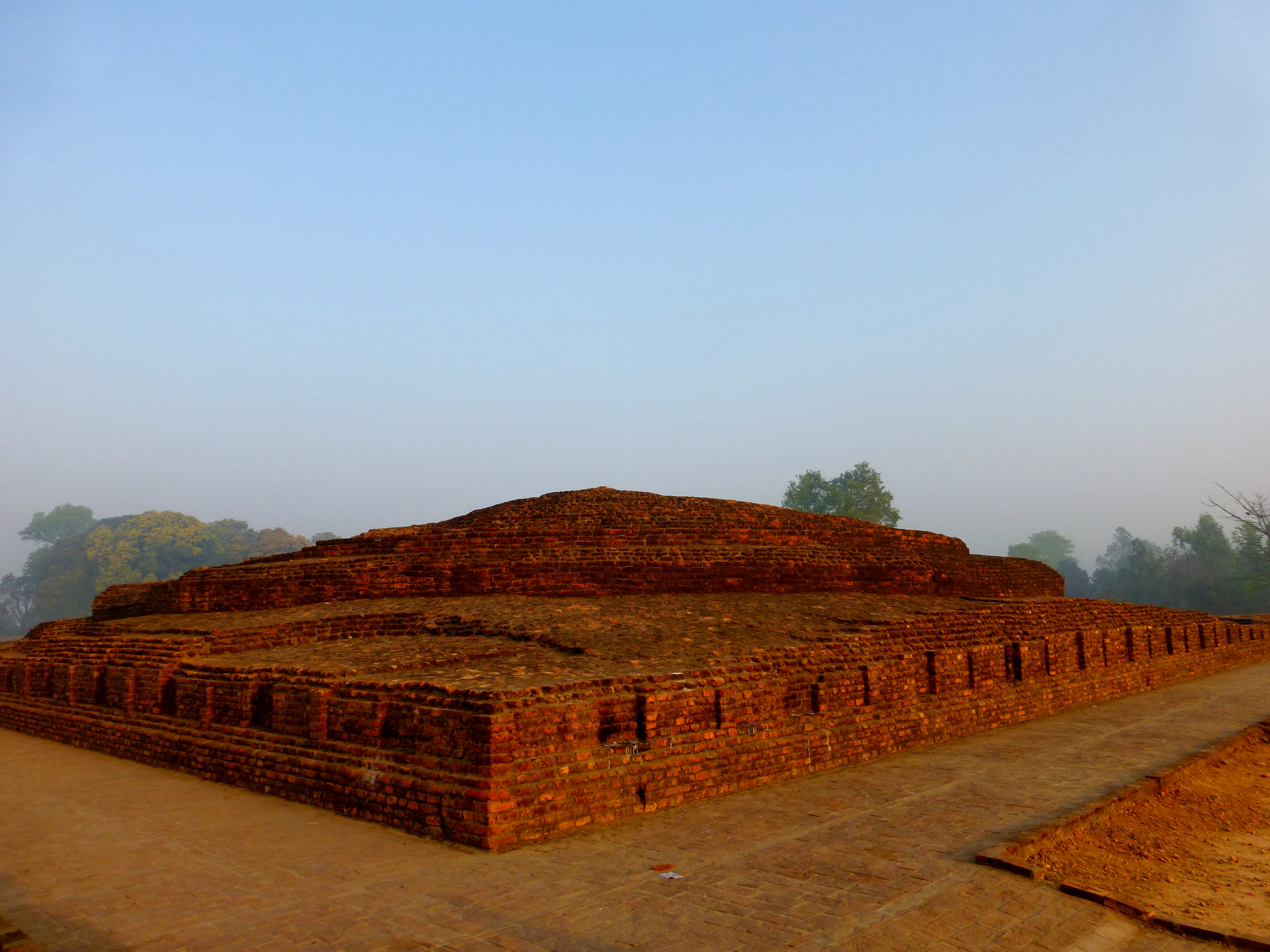
Stupa at Piprahwa

== Ancient depictions ==
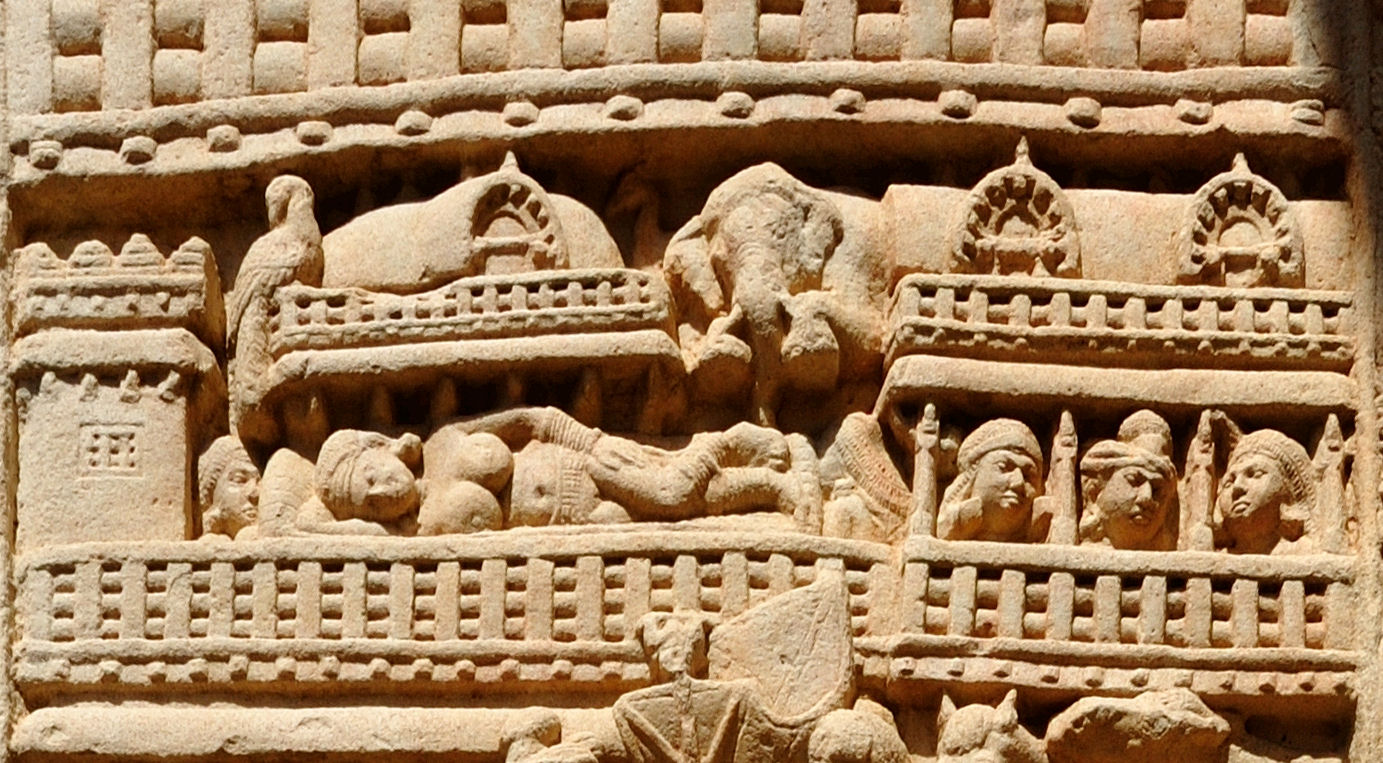
Maya's dream of an elephant during her conception of the Buddha, an identifier of the city of Kapilavastu.

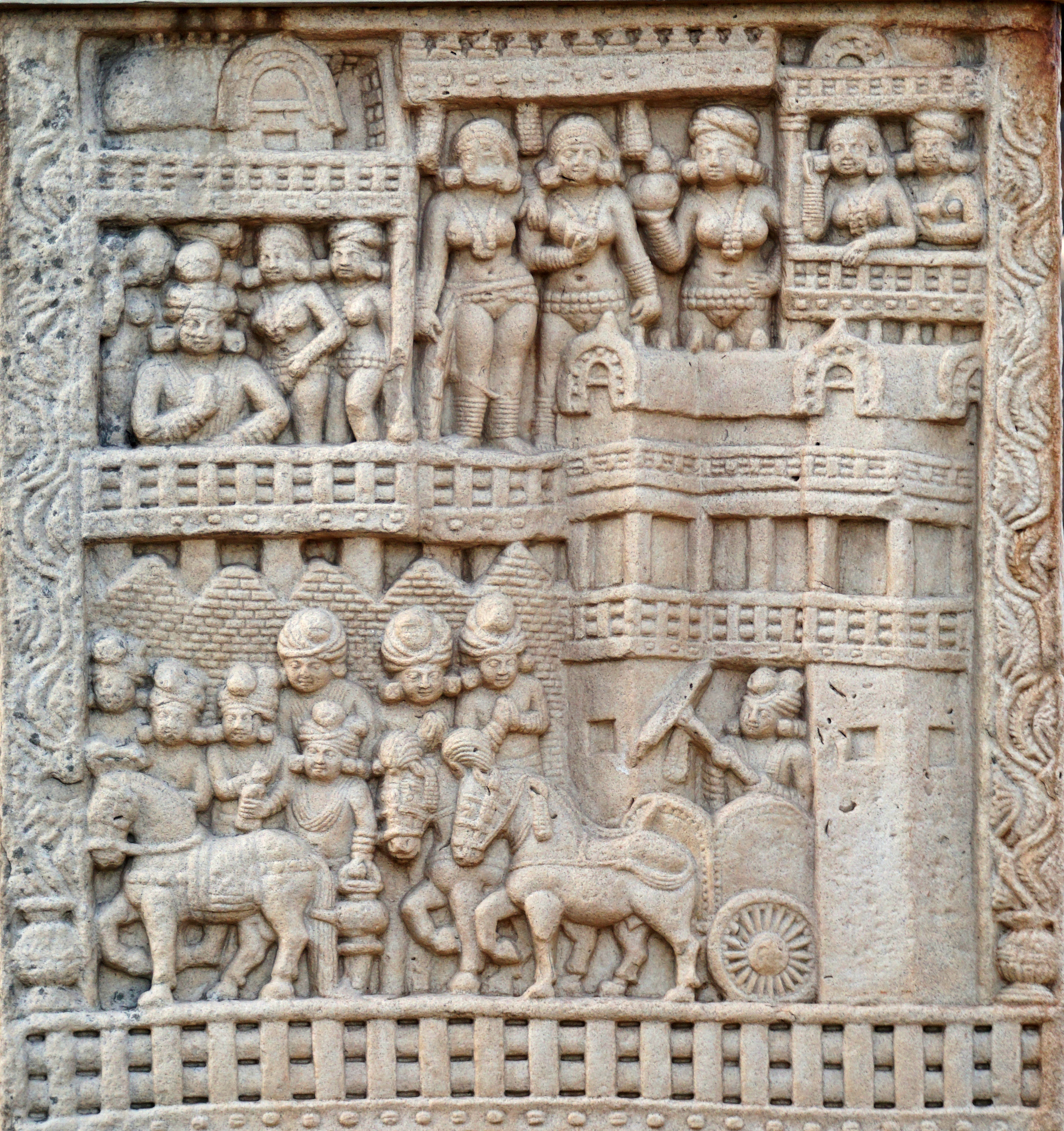
The departure of the Buddha from Kapilavastu, Sanchi, Stupa 1, Northern Gate.

== Notable people ==
- Puṇṇa Mantānīputta – one of the Buddha's ten principal disciples
- Anuruddha – among the ten principal disciples and also a cousin of the Buddha
- Rāhula – the only son of the Buddha
- Ānanda – primary attendant of the Buddha and among the ten principal disciples
- Sahajaśrī - 14th century CE Buddhist monk

== Bibliography ==
- Coningham, Robin; Young, Ruth (2015). The Archaeology of South Asia: From the Indus to Asoka, c.6500 BCE–200 CE. Cambridge University Press. pp. 438–440. ISBN 978-1-316-41898-7.
