= Ganwaria =

Village in Uttar Pradesh, India

- Village
- Interactive map of Ganwaria
- Country: India
- State: Uttar Pradesh
- District: Balrampur
- Tehsil: Balrampur

Population (2011)
  - Total: 1,562

Ganwaria is a medium size village in Balrampur district, Uttar Pradesh state of India. It is a noted archaeological site, along with Piprahwa.
