= Bangai =

Bangai may refer to several places in Nepal:

- Bangai, Kapilvastu
- Bangai, Rupandehi
- Bangai Marchwar
- Hati Bangai
- Khadawa Bangai

== See also ==
- Bangui, Central African Republic
- Bangai-O
- Bangai-O Spirits
- Banggai, a group of Indonesian islands
