= Mayadevi Rural Municipality, Kapilvastu =

Mayadevi (RM) मायादेवी गाउँपालिका
- Rural Municipality
- Location Mayadevi (RM) (Nepal)
- Coordinates: 27°32′24″N 83°9′0″E
- Country: Nepal
- Province: Lumbini
- District: Kapilvastu
- Wards: 8
- Established: 10 March 2017

Government
  - Type: Rural Council
  - Chairperson: Bajrangi Prasad Kurmi
  - Vice-chairperson: Mrs. Gita Tiwari
  - Term of office: (2017 - 2022)

Area
  - Total: 88.53 km^{2} (34.18 sq mi)

Population (2011)
  - Total: 48,218
  - Density: 544.7/km^{2} (1,411/sq mi)
- Time zone: UTC+5:45 (Nepal Standard Time)
- Headquarter: Pakadi
- Website: mayadevimunkapilvastu.gov.np

Mayadevi is a Rural municipality located within the Kapilvastu District of the Lumbini Province of Nepal. The municipality spans 88.53 square kilometres (34.18 sq mi) of area, with a total population of 48,218 according to a 2011 Nepal census.

On March 10, 2017, the Government of Nepal restructured the local level bodies into 753 new local level structures. The previous Pakadi, Abhirawa, Phulika, Pipri, Baluhawa, Dumra, Haranampur and Bijuwa VDCs were merged to form Mayadevi Rural Municipality. Mayadevi is divided into 8 wards, with Pakadi declared the administrative center of the rural municipality.
