= Jagdishpur Reservoir =

- Nepali: जगदीशपुर जलाशय
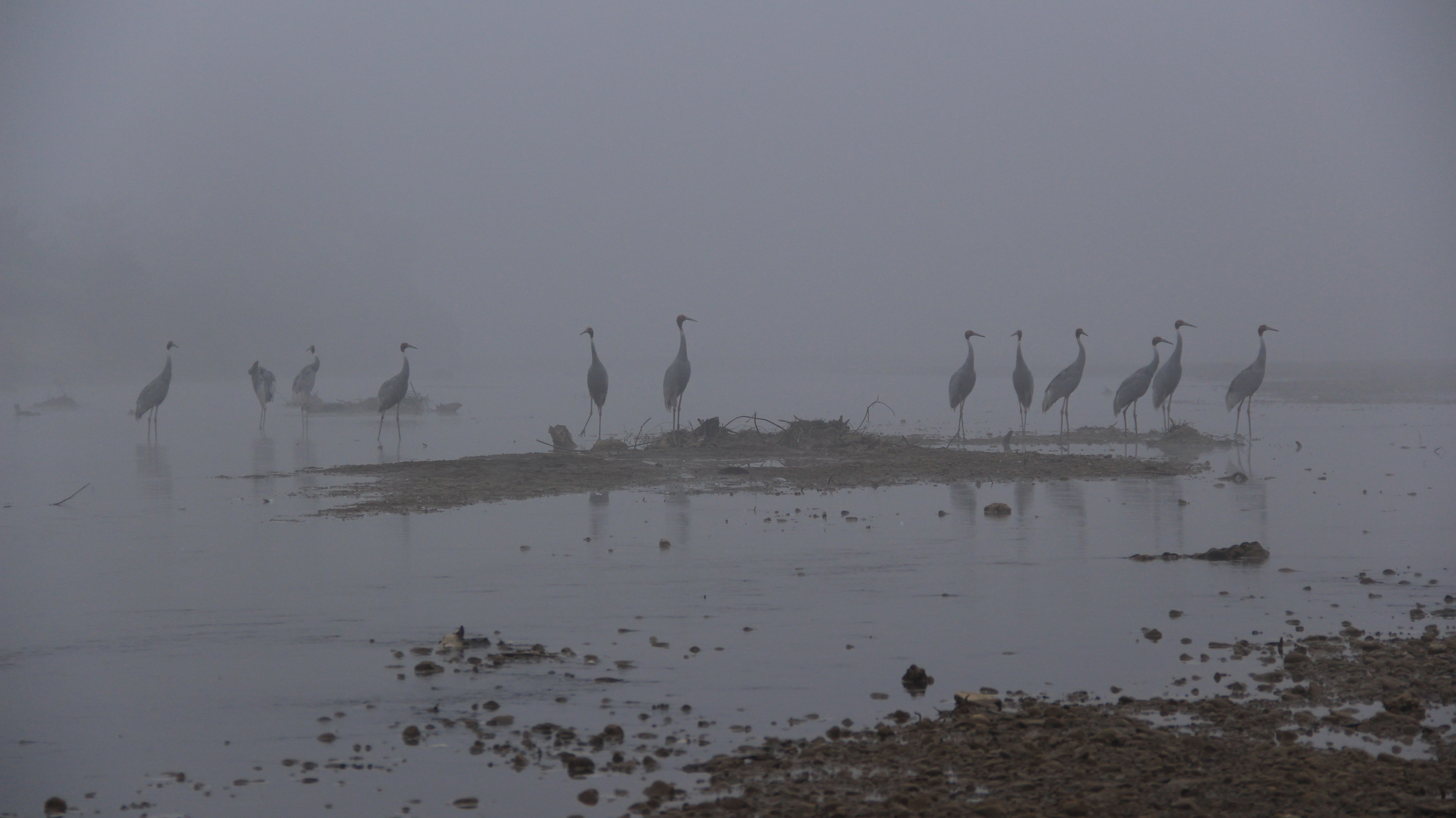
- A group of sarus cranes (Antigone antigone) at Jagdishpur Reservoir

- Location within Lumbini Province Location within Nepal Location within South Asia
- Location: Jahadi, Kapilvastu District, Nepal
- Coordinates: 27°35′00″N 83°05′00″E
- Lake type: Reservoir
- Primary inflows: Banganga River
- River sources: Banganga River
- Primary outflows: Banganga River
- Catchment area: Sivalik Hills
- Basin countries: Nepal
- Managing agency: Department of Irrigation and District Forest Office
- Designation: Ramsar List of Wetlands of International Importance
- Max. length: 1.6 km (1 mi)
- Max. width: 1.4 km (1 mi)
- Surface area: 225 ha (556 acres)
- Surface elevation: 197 m (646 ft)
- Settlements: Dhankauli, Hathausa, Jahadi, Jayanagar, Kapilvastu, Kopawa, Nigalihawa

Ramsar Wetland
- Designated: 13 August 2003
- Reference no.: 1315

The Jagdishpur Reservoir is a reservoir in Jahadi Village Development Committee, Kapilvastu District, Nepal which was named after Er. Jagadish Jha who designed and supervised the construction of Banaganga dam. With a surface area of 225 ha (2.25 km^{2}), it is the largest reservoir in the country and an important wetland site. It is situated at an altitude of 197 m (646 ft). The maximum water depth varies between 2 m (6.6 ft) in the dry season and 7 m (23 ft) in the monsoon season.

The Jagdishpur Reservoir is listed on the List of Ramsar Wetlands of International Importance, as defined by the Ramsar Convention.

== History ==
At Jakhira Lake during the 1970s, Jagdishpur was created to provide water to crops. In 2003, the reservoir was declared a Ramsar site. Despite this, its birds and other fauna have not yet been studied in great detail.

== Fauna ==
The silt and nutrients deposited in the reservoir favour the growth of reed beds, which provide shelter for several endangered species. The habitat of the reservoir and its surroundings is important for resident, wintering and migrating wetland birds, comprising 45 different bird species. Five of these are globally threatened species. The surrounding cultivated land also provides habitat for a large numbers of birds. Some of the notable species documented in the area include:

- Asian openbill (Anastomus oscitans)
- Black-winged kite (Elanus caeruleus)
- Egyptian vulture (Neophron percnopterus), a globally threatened species
- Greater spotted eagle (Clanga clanga), a globally threatened species
- Indian spotted eagle (Clanga hastata), a globally threatened species
- Lesser adjutant (Leptoptilos javanicus), a globally threatened species
- Long-tailed shrike (Lanius schach tricolor)
- Oriental darter (Anhinga melanogaster)
- Pied kingfisher (Ceryle rudis)
- Red-wattled lapwing (Vanellus indicus)
- Ruddy kingfisher (Halcyon coromanda)
- Sarus crane (Grus antigone), a globally threatened species
- Slender-billed vulture (Gyps tenuirostris), a globally threatened species
- Smooth-coated otter (Lutrogale perspicillata), a globally threatened species
- White-rumped vulture (Gyps bengalensis), a globally threatened species
- Woolly-necked stork (Ciconia episcopus), a globally threatened species

Also 18 species of fish, nine of herpetofauna and six mammalian species have been documented in and around the reservoir.
