= Buddhabhumi =

Buddhabhumi बुद्धभूमि
- Municipality (नगरपालिका)
- Motto(s): "खुशी नगरबासी, समृद्ध बुद्धभूमी"
- Location in Nepal
- Coordinates: 27.65°N 83.06°E
- Country: Nepal
- Province: Lumbini
- District: Kapilvastu
- No. of Wards: 10 Wards
- Established: 02/12/2014
- Incorporated (date): 2017
- Incorporated (VDC): Jayanagar, Mahendrakot, Dubiya, Bhrikuti, Mahuba, Manpur, Dhankauli

Government
  - Type: Mayor–council
  - Mayor: Mr. Keshab Kumar Shreshtha
  - Deputy Mayor: Meera Tharu

Area
  - Total: 366.67 km^{2} (141.57 sq mi)

Population (2011)
  - Total: 64,949
  - Density: 177.13/km^{2} (458.77/sq mi)
- Time zone: UTC+5:45 (NST)
- Postal code: 32809
- Area code: +76
- Website: buddhabhumimun.gov.np

Buddhabhumi is a Municipality in Kapilvastu District in the Lumbini Province of southern Nepal. It is located 308 km west of Kathmandu, 47 km west of Butwal and 206 km east of Nepalgung.

On December 2, 2014, Nepal government announced the creation of 61 new municipalities across the country. A meeting of the Cabinet Social Committee held at the Prime Minister's Office at Singdurbar Tuesday took a decision to this effect on a proposal forwarded by the Ministry of Federal Affairs and Local Development (MoFALD).Buddhabhumi was among 61 municipality that has been declared.

Buddhabhumi Municipality was established merging three Village Development Committees, e.g.: Jayanagar, Mahendrakot, Dubiya. It was named Buddhawatika Municipality during establishment, later on 10 March 2017 four more VDCs were Incorporated with it and renamed to Buddhabhumi. The following VDCs were Incorporated later: Bhrikuti, Mahuba, Manpur and Dhankauli.

Through highway, Buddhabhumi connects western Nepal to the capital Kathmandu. It has highway connections to the Indian Border at Krishnanagar and to hill towns Sandhikarkha and Tansen. Buddhabatika is a major gateway to the birthplace of gautam buddha.

Buddhabhumi means the land of Gautam Buddha, an icon of peace in the world.

== Localities ==
- Imiliya

== Culture ==
Hindus in the majority celebrate Holi, Teej, Maha Shivratri, Dashain, Tihar and Bhai Tika. There are also Buddhist and Muslims. There is a good relationship among different religious and ethnic community which can be seen during festivals.

Nepali is the common language spoken in Buddhabatika. Gurung, Magar and Tharu people speak native language in their community. English is not popular; however, most of the young people can communicate in English. The shop names are generally written in English in addition to Nepali alphabet.

== Education ==
Although, there are Some adequate educational institutions among them the popular institutions are listed below:

- Parijat Public School, Gorusinge
- Shree Ganga Jyoti Higher Secondary School Pattharkot
- Shree Bhrikuti Secondary school, Buddhi
- Adarsha English Boarding School Imiliya
- Social Higher Secondary English Boarding School
- Shree Gautam Buddha Higher Secondary School
- Shanti Deep Boarding School
- Namaste Lions English Secondary School
- Shree Jankalyan Higher Secondary School, Bakulipur

There is a Bachelor level campus in the municipality. it runs BBS, BEd and BBS. The Gautam Buddha Multiple campus is the only Bachelor level campus in the Municipality.
