= Kapilvastu Municipality =

Historical city in Kapilvastu District of Lumbini Province, Nepal

Kapilvastu कपिलवस्तु Taulihawa (तौलिहवा)
- Municipality (नगरपालिका)
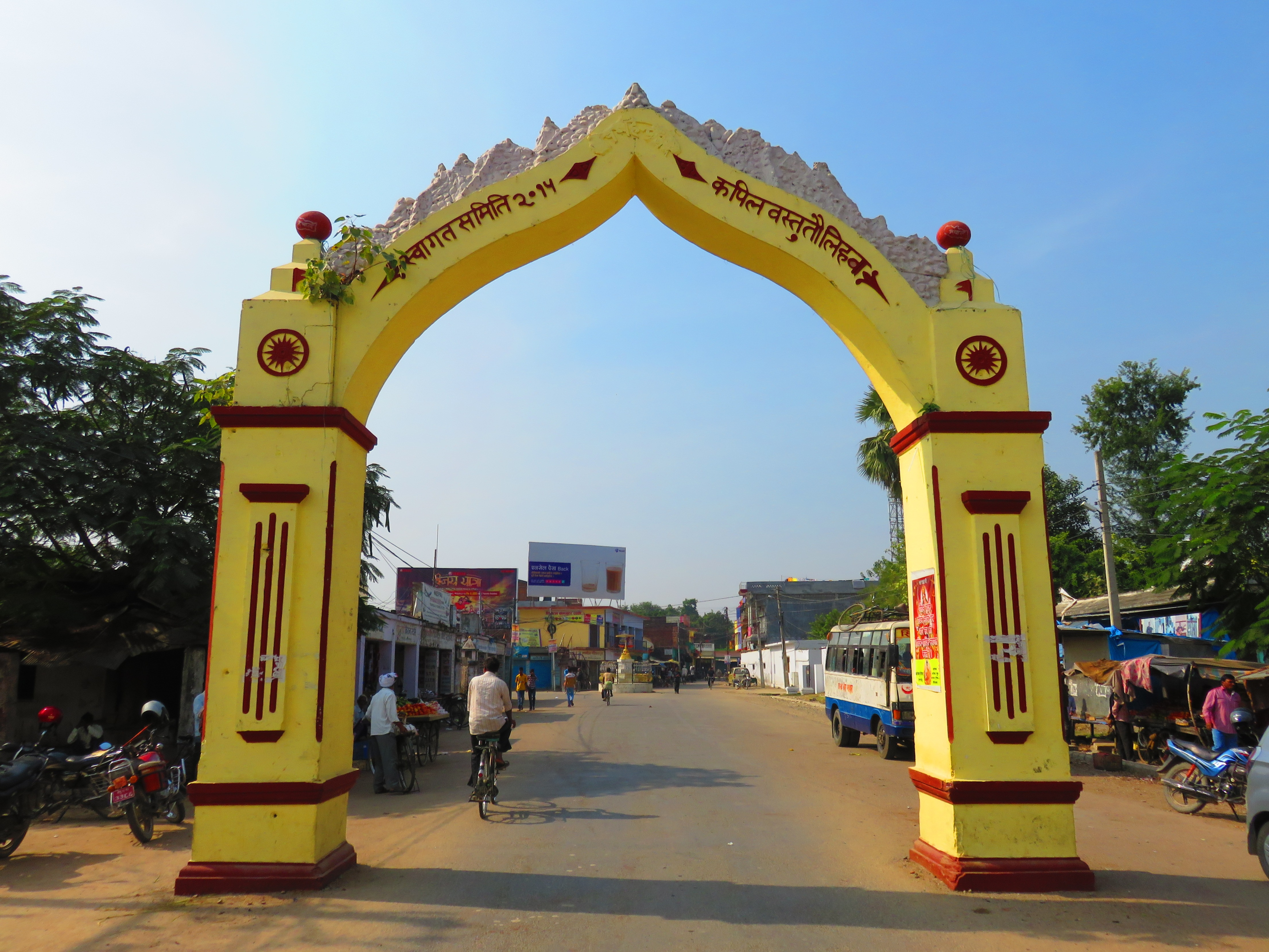
- Entrance gate to Taulihawa, Kapilvastu District, Nepal

- Location in Lumbini Province Kapilvastu (Nepal)
- Coordinates: 27°32′N 83°3′E
- Country: Nepal
- Province: Lumbini Province
- District: Kapilvastu District
- Wards: 12
- Established: 1982

Government
  - Type: Mayor-council
  - Mayor: Sudeep Paudel (NC)
  - Deputy Mayor: Sunita Gupta (NC)
  - Term of office: (2022 - 2027)

Area
  - Total: 136.9 km^{2} (52.9 sq mi)
- Elevation: 107 m (351 ft)

Population (2011 A.D)
  - Total: 76,394
  - Density: 558.0/km^{2} (1,445/sq mi)
- Time zone: UTC+5:45 (NST)
- Postal code: 32800
- Area code: 076
- Website: kapilvastumun.gov.np

Kapilvastu, formerly known by name of Taulihawa, is a municipality and administrative center of Kapilvastu District in Lumbini Province of southern Nepal. The municipality is located roughly 25 kilometres (16 mi) to the south-west of Lumbini, a UNESCO World Heritage Site and the birthplace of Gautama Buddha.

Kapilvastu Municipality was established in 1982 with the name of Taulihawa Nagarpanchayat merging Bargadawa, Maalpara, Pipari, Kapilvastu Adarsh Gaau and some portion of Tilaurakot, Gotihawa and Gobari Gaunpanchayat. On 7 November 2014, the remaining region of Gotihawa and Tilaurakot VDC were included, making a total of 19 wards within this municipality.

On March 10, 2017, the Government of Nepal restructured the local-level bodies into 753 new local level structures. The previous Taulihawa Municipality with Dharampaniya, Dohani, Jahadi, Nigalihawa and Sauraha VDCs were merged to form Kapilvastu Municipality. Now the total area of the municipality is 136.91 square kilometres (52.86 sq mi) and the total population is 76,394. The municipality is now divided into 12 wards.

The municipality lies at an altitude of 107 metres (351 ft) above sea level

== History ==
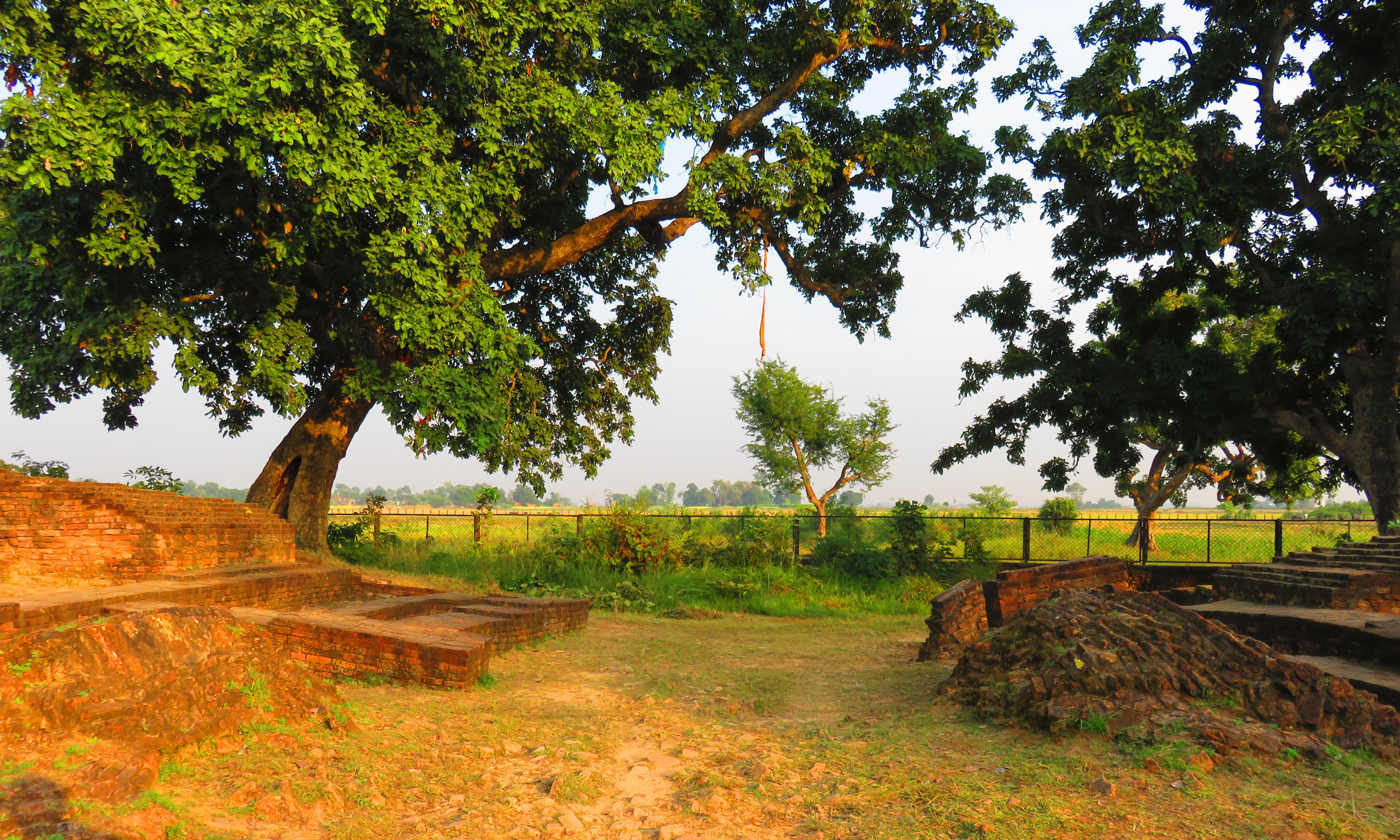
The east gate at Tilaurakot archaeological site in Kapilavastu municipality, Kapilvastu District, Nepal.

Tilaurakot located in Kapilavastu municipality (Taulihawa) may have been the ancient city of Kapilavastu. On the other hand, nearby Piprahwa in India has also been proposed as the location for the historical site of Kapilavastu.

The 19th-century search for the historical site of Kapilavastu followed the accounts left by Faxian and later by Xuanzang, who were Chinese Buddhist monks who made early pilgrimages to the site. Kapilavastu was an ancient city and the capital city of the Shakya kingdom. King Śuddhodana and Queen Māyā are believed to have lived at Kapilavastu, as did their son Prince Siddartha Gautama until he left the palace at the age of 29.

== Historical sites ==
There are many sites of historical interest in or very close to Kapilavastu, including:

- Amaulikot
- Arourakot Darbar
- Bardahawa
- Bargadawa Stupa
- Bikulikot
- Derwa Stupa
- Dohanikot
- Gotihawa, birthplace of Kakusandha Buddha, marked by an Ashoka pillar
- Jagdishpur Reservoir
- Kanthak Stupa
- Kapilvastu Museum
- Kopawa Stupa
- Nigrodharama, the ruins of a Buddhist monastery where Gautama Buddha is believed to have stayed when visiting Kapilavastu
- Lohasariya Stupa
- Lumbini, the birthplace of Gautama Buddha
- Nigali Sagar, an archeological site in Nigalihawa, birthplace of Koṇāgamana Buddha, marked by an Ashoka pillar
- Paltimai Temple
- Pipara Stupa
- Pipari
- Piprahwa, a village and archaeological site in Siddharthnagar district, Uttar Pradesh, India that may be one of the burial sites of a portion of the ashes of Gautama Buddha
- Premnagar Stupa
- Ramagrama stupa, believed to be the only intact and original stupa containing relics of Buddha
- Rampur Siddhipur Stupa
- Sagarahawa Reservoir
- Sarkup Pokhari
- Semara Shiv Mandir
- Sihokhor Stupa
- Siseniya Stupa
- Tauleshwor Nath Mandir (Shree Tauleshwor Nath Mandir) is a devotional temple for Hindus. Many Hindus come here to worship Shiva during the Maha Shivaratri festival.
- Tilaurakot
- Twin Stupa

== See also ==
- Kumarwarti
