= Sheshkala Pandey =

Nepalese women's rights activist

Sheshkala Pandey is a Nepalese women's rights activist. She received the national "Unsung Hero Award" by the Ministry of Women, Children and Social Welfare in Nepal, for her fight to end child marriage and to encourage young girls to study.

== Life ==
Sheshkala Pandey was born in the village Bithuwa in the Kapilvastu District of Nepal. As is common in the poor area, she was supposed to get married in eighth grade. Unwilling to do so, she borrowed money from her brother, created a business plan and set up a business to cover her tuition fees. This made it possible for her to finish college in Nepal. Because of her struggle to go to college, and to help other girls in the same situation, she received the national award "Unsung Hero Award", presented by the Ministry of Women, Children and Social Welfare and awarded by the minister Bikram Bahadur Thapa.

Pandey founded and is currently the head of a Girls' Circle in her home area, with some 30 members. The Circle, which is supported by the Ministry and the UN Population Fund, works against child marriage, sexual abuse and other similar practices in Nepal, and aims to get more girls to stay in school. Among other things, they perform street drama and door-to-door programs to increase public awareness on issues such as gender-based violence, and the importance of education. Due to the interventions by the circle, nine girls had during the first 1,5 years been saved from child marriage in Bithuwa.
