= Kajarhawa =

Kajarhawa कजर्हवा
- Village development committee
- Location in Nepal
- Coordinates: 27.52°N 82.98°E
- Country: Nepal
- Zone: Lumbini Zone
- District: Kapilvastu District

Government
  - vice Mayor: Shubawati Kurmi

Population (1991)
  - Total: 3,438
- Time zone: UTC+5:45 (Nepal Time)

Kajarhawa is a village in Kapilvastu District in the Lumbini Province of southern Nepal. At the time of the 2001 Nepal census it had a population of 3438 people living in 571 individual households.

Formerly, Kajarhawa was a village development committee (VDC), which were local-level administrative units. In 2017, the government of Nepal restructured local government in line with the 2015 constitution and VDCs were discontinued.
