= Baraipur =

Baraipur बराइपुर
- Village development committee
- Location in Nepal
- Coordinates: 27.56°N 82.93°E
- Country: Nepal
- Zone: Lumbini Zone
- District: Kapilvastu District

Population (1991)
  - Total: 2,769
- Time zone: UTC+5:45 (Nepal Time)

Baraipur is a village development committee in Kapilvastu District in the Lumbini Zone of southern Nepal. At the time of the 1991 Nepal census it had a population of 2769.
