= Gugauli =

Gugauli गुगौली
- Village development committee
- Location in Nepal
- Coordinates: 27.69°N 82.75°E
- Country: Nepal
- Zone: Lumbini Zone
- District: Kapilvastu District

Population (1991)
  - Total: 4,433
- Time zone: UTC+5:45 (Nepal Time)

Gugauli is a village development committee in Kapilvastu District in the Lumbini Zone of southern Nepal. At the time of the 1991 Nepal census it had a population of 4433 people living in 730 individual households.
