= Khurhuriya =

Khurhuriya खुर्हुरिया
- Village development committee
- Location in Nepal
- Coordinates: 27.61°N 82.77°E
- Country: Nepal
- Zone: Lumbini Zone
- District: Kapilvastu District

Population (1991)
  - Total: 8,837
- Time zone: UTC+5:45 (Nepal Time)

Khurhuriya is a village development committee in Kapilvastu District in the Lumbini Zone of southern Nepal. At the time of the 1991 Nepal census, it had a population of 8837 people living in 1474 individual households.
