= Karmahawa =

Karmahawa कर्महवा
- Village development committee
- Country: Nepal
- Province: Lumbini Province
- District: [Kapilvastu District]]

Population (1991)
  - Total: 3,744
- Time zone: UTC+5:45 (Nepal Time)

Karmahawa is a village development committee in Kapilvastu District in Lumbini Province of southern Nepal. At the time of the 1991 Nepal census it had a population of 3744 people living in 605 individual households.
