= Hathihawa =

Hathihawa हथिहवा
- Village development committee
- Location in Nepal
- Coordinates: 27.46°N 83.21°E
- Country: Nepal
- Zone: Lumbini Zone
- District: Kapilvastu District

Population (1991)
  - Total: 5,597
- Time zone: UTC+5:45 (Nepal Time)

Hathihawa is a village development committee in Kapilvastu District in the Lumbini Zone of southern Nepal. At the time of the 1991 Nepal census it had a population of 5597 people living in 878 individual households. There are villages in this division. The Inhabitants of this area are Awadhi People. It borders Rupandehi district to the east, Bithuwa VDC to the west and south, Indian border Kakarahawa, Uttar Pradesh to the North.
