= Bikuli, Kapilvastu =

Village in Nepal

Bikuli is a small village in the Kapilvastu Municipality, ward number 10 in the Kapilvastu District of western Nepal. The village was named Bikuli because there were no water sources (Kulo) for irrigation in that village and hence meaning is without canals. Bikuli was a new version of Bekulo ('Be' stands for 'not' and 'Kulo' stands for 'canals').

The village is situated 8 km north of the district capital, Taulihawa and 8.5 km north of the Tilaurakot, the proper kapilvastu, where Lord Gautam Buddha is said to have been born and grown up. The village is 12 km south from the east–west Highway of Nepal. The village lies on the bank of the largest man-made lake in Asia, Jagdishpur Reservoir. The reservoir was constructed for the collection of river water for the irrigation of the southern belt of the Kapilvastu District during the dry season.

More than 70% people in Bikuli are educated. The major occupation of people in this village is agricultural activities.
