= Dohani =

Dohani दोहनी
- Village development committee
- Location in Nepal
- Coordinates: 27.53°N 83.09°E
- Country: Nepal
- Zone: Lumbini Zone
- District: Kapilvastu District

Population (1991)
  - Total: 4,253
- Time zone: UTC+5:45 (Nepal Time)

Dohani is a village development committee in Kapilvastu District in the Lumbini Zone of southern Nepal. When the 1991 Nepal census came around, Dohani had a population of 4253 people living in 716 individual households. This village is the head quarter of Kapilvastu ward no.8. Now this is headquarter of Kapilvastu Municipality ward no. 8.
