= Shivapur Palta =

Shivapur Palta शिवपुर पल्टा
- Village development committee
- Country: Nepal
- Zone: Lumbini Zone
- District: Kapilvastu District

Population (1991)
  - Total: 2,433
- Time zone: UTC+5:45 (Nepal Time)

Shivapur Palta is a village development committee in Kapilvastu District in the Lumbini Zone of southern Nepal. At the time of the 1991 Nepal census it had a population of 2433 people living in 420 individual households.
