= Vidhyanagar, Kapilvastu =

Vidhyanagar विद्यानगर
- Village
- Location in Nepal
- Coordinates: 27.55°N 82.80°E
- Country: Nepal
- Zone: Lumbini Zone
- District: Kapilvastu District

Population (1991)
  - Total: 3,315
- Time zone: UTC+5:45 (Nepal Time)

Vidhyanagar is a village in Kapilvastu District in the Lumbini Zone of southern Nepal. At the time of the 1991 Nepal census it had a population of 3315 people living in 538 individual households.

Formerly, Vidhyanagar was a village development committee (VDC), which were local-level administrative units. In 2017, the government of Nepal restructured local government in line with the 2015 constitution and VDCs were discontinued.
