= Bhagawanpur Choti =

Bhagawanpur Choti भगवानपुर चोटी
- Village development committee
- Country: Nepal
- Zone: Lumbini Zone
- District: Kapilvastu District

Population (1991)
  - Total: 3,960
- Time zone: UTC+5:45 (Nepal Time)

Bhagawanpur Choti is a village development committee in Kapilvastu District in the Lumbini Zone of southern Nepal. At the time of the 1991 Nepal census it had a population of 3960 people living in 654 individual households.
