= Bedauli =

Baidauli बैदौली
- Village development committee
- Location in Nepal
- Coordinates: 27.48°N 83.01°E
- Country: Nepal
- Zone: Lumbini Zone
- District: Kapilvastu District
- Established: 5 July 2017

Government
  - Type: Democracy
  - Chairman: Girije Kumar Panda (Nepali congress)
  - Ward Chairman: naima Pathan (Naya Shakti Party, Nepal)

Population (2001)
  - Total: 5,819
- Time zone: UTC+5:45 (Nepal Standard Time)
- Postal code: 32800
- Area code: 076

Bedauli is a village development committee in Kapilvastu District in the Lumbini Zone of southern Nepal. At the time of the 2001 Nepal census it had a population of 5819 people living in 1404 individual households.
