= Mayadevi Rural Municipality =

Mayadevi Rural Municipality may refer to:

- Mayadevi Rural Municipality, Rupandehi; a rural municipality in Rupandehi District of Nepal
- Mayadevi Rural Municipality, Kapilvastu; a rural municipality in Kapilvastu District of Nepal
