= Bhalabari =

Bhalawari भलाबारी
- Village development committee
- Country: Nepal
- Zone: Lumbini Zone
- District: Kapilvastu District

Government

Population (1991)
  - Total: 3,525
- Time zone: UTC+5:45 (Nepal Time)

Bhalabari is a village development committee in Kapilvastu District in the Lumbini Zone of southern Nepal. At the time of the 1991 Nepal census it had a population of 3525 people living in 583 individual households.
