= Labani =

Labani लाबनी
- Village development committee
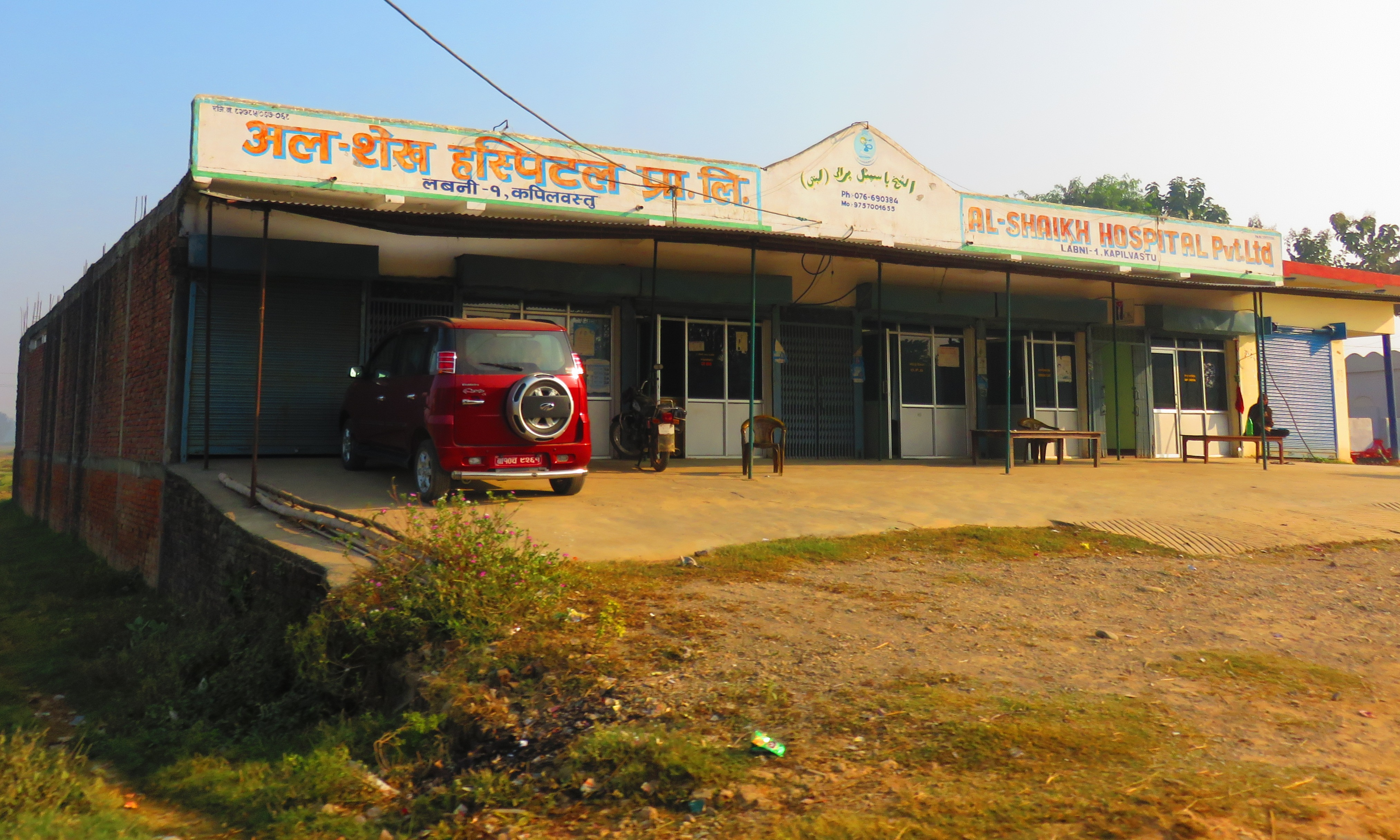
- Al Shaikh Hospital in Labani village

- Location in Nepal
- Coordinates: 27.51°N 83.21°E
- Country: Nepal
- Zone: Lumbini Zone
- District: Kapilvastu District

Government
  - Type: Nepal communist party
  - Mayor: Kamlesh Choudhary

Population (2021)
  - Total: 45,201
- Time zone: UTC+5:45 (Nepal Time)
- Area code: 32800

Suddhodhan Rural municipality (Kapilvastu)

Labani is a village development committee in Kapilvastu District in the Lumbini Zone of southern Nepal. VDC (Ward) Name was Suddhodhan Rural municipality. They Total area (91.69 km). It is located on Taulihawa Road, 7 kilometres (4.3 mi) west of Lumbini. Current population of 45201 people in 2021 .
