= Ajingara =

Place in Nepal

Coordinates: 27°31′N 82°52′E

Ajingara अजिंगरा
- Village development committee
- Interactive map of Ajingara
- Country: Nepal
- Zone: Lumbini Zone
- District: Kapilvastu District

Population (1991)
  - Total: 3,646
- Time zone: UTC+5:45 (Nepal Time)

Ajingara is a village development committee in Kapilvastu District in the Lumbini Zone of southern Nepal. At the time of the 1991 Nepal census it had a population of 3646 people living in 603 individual households.
