= Purusottampur, Nepal =

Purusottampur पुरुषोत्तमपुर
- Village development committee
- Location in Nepal
- Coordinates: 27.51°N 82.84°E
- Country: Nepal
- Zone: Lumbini Zone
- District: Kapilvastu District

Population (1991)
  - Total: 2,379
- Time zone: UTC+5:45 (Nepal Time)

Purusottampur is a village development committee in Kapilvastu District in the Lumbini Zone of southern Nepal. At the time of the 1991 Nepal census it had a population of 2379 people living in 343 individual households.
