= Patariya =

Patariya पतरिया (بتريا)
- Village development committee
- Location in Nepal
- Coordinates: 27.58°N 83.18°E
- Country: Nepal
- Zone: Lumbini Zone
- District: Kapilvastu District

Government
  - Type: VDC

Population (1991)
  - Total: 4,960
- Time zone: UTC+5:45 (Nepal Time)
- Postal code: 32802

Patariya is a village development committee in Kapilvastu District in the Lumbini Zone of southern Nepal. At the time of the 1991 Nepal census it had a population of 4960 people living in 801 individual households.
