= Singhkhor =

Sihokhore Sihokhore
- Village development committee
- Location in Nepal
- Coordinates: 27.51°N 82.99°E
- Country: Nepal
- Zone: Lumbini Zone
- District: Kapilvastu District

Government
  - वाडा अध्यक्ष: सहाबुद्दीन खान

Population (1991)
  - Total: 3,902
- Time zone: UTC+5:45 (Nepal Time)

Sihokhore is a village development committee in Kapilvastu District in the Lumbini Zone of southern Nepal. At the time of the 1991 Nepal census it had a population of 3902 people living in 646 individual households.
