= Bangai, Kapilvastu =

Bangain बनगाई
- Village development committee
- Country: Nepal
- Zone: Lumbini Zone
- District: Kapilvastu District

Population (1991)
  - Total: 2,983
- Time zone: UTC+5:45 (Nepal Time)

Bangai is a village development committee in Kapilvastu District in the Lumbini Zone of southern Nepal. Locally, there are two places known by the name of Bangai, Gherawa Bangain in the east and Koili Bangain in the west, separated by the distance of 1 km. Mahendra Highway (Mahendra Rajmarg in Nepali) or east–west highway passes through it. The Banganga river marks the south boundary of Bangain. Manoharipur is the first adjacent village in the south of it which lies in the Kopawa V.D.C. Locally, Bangain is famous for its funeral site on the bank of Banganga known as Laxmanghat. It is also a major shopping hub within 5 km of its radius due to its proximity with the highway. At the time of the 2021 Nepal census it had a population of 96,743 people living in 528 individual households.
