= Birpur, Nepal =

Birpur बीरपुर Motinagar
- Nickname: Chanauta
- Location in Nepal
- Coordinates: 27.63°N 82.86°E
- Country: Nepal
- Zone: Lumbini Zone
- District: Kapilvastu District

Population (2001)
  - Total: 15,255
- Time zone: UTC+5:45 (Nepal Time)

Birpur is a town in Shivaraj Municipality in Kapilvastu District in the Lumbini Zone of southern Nepal. The former village development committee was transformed into Municipality from 18 May 2014 by merging the existing Birpur, Nepal, Chanai, Bishunpur, Jawabhari and Shivapur village development committees. At the time of the 2001 Nepal census it had a population of 15255 people living in 1209 individual households.

== Media ==
To Promote local culture Birpur has one FM radio station Radio Samanata - 105.4 MHz Which is a Community radio Station.
