= Chanai =

Chanai चनै
- Location in Nepal
- Coordinates: 27.64°N 82.89°E
- Country: Nepal
- Zone: Lumbini Zone
- District: Kapilvastu District

Population (1991)
  - Total: 6,141
- Time zone: UTC+5:45 (Nepal Time)

not to be confused with Chennai, India

Chanai is a town in Shivaraj Municipality in Kapilvastu District in the Lumbini Zone of southern Nepal. The former village development committee was transformed into Municipality from 18 May 2014 by merging the existing Birpur, Nepal, Chanai, Bishunpur, Jawabhari and Shivapur village development committees. At the time of the 1991 Nepal census it had a population of 6141 people living in 1023 individual households.
