= Kushawa =

Coordinates: 27°32′N 82°54′E

Kushawa कुशवा
- Village development committee
- Interactive map of Kushawa
- Country: Nepal
- Zone: Lumbini Zone
- District: Kapilvastu District

Population (1991)
  - Total: 3,586
- Time zone: UTC+5:45 (Nepal Time)

Kushawa is a village development committee in Kapilvastu District in the Lumbini Zone of southern Nepal. At the time of the 1991 Nepal census it had a population of 3586 people living in 578 individual households.
