= Nanda Nagar =

Coordinates: 27°32′N 83°13′E

Nanda Nagar नन्दनगर
- Village development committee
- Interactive map of Nanda Nagar
- Country: Nepal
- Zone: Lumbini Zone
- District: Kapilvastu District

Population (1991)
  - Total: 4,740
- Time zone: UTC+5:45 (Nepal Time)

Nanda Nagar is a village development committee in Kapilvastu District in the Lumbini Zone of southern Nepal. At the time of the 1991 Nepal census it had a population of 4740 people living in 808 individual households.
