= Bishunpur, Nepal =

Bishunpur बिष्णुपुर
- Location in Nepal
- Coordinates: 27.60°N 82.85°E
- Country: Nepal
- Zone: Lumbini Zone
- District: Kapilvastu District

Population (1991)
  - Total: 2,942
- Time zone: UTC+5:45 (Nepal Time)

Bishunpur is a town in Shivaraj Municipality in Kapilvastu District in the Lumbini Zone of southern Nepal. The former village development committee was transformed into a Municipality from 18 May 2014 by merging the existing Birpur, Nepal, Chanai, Bishunpur, Jawabhari and Shivapur village development committees. At the time of the 1991 Nepal census it had a population of 2942 people living in 472 individual households.
