= Milmi =

Bhilmi भिल्मी अखंड भिल्मी
- Village development committee
- Milmi
- Hindu
- Seal
- Nickname: Milmi
- Location in Nepal
- Coordinates: 27.51°N 82.87°E
- Country: Nepal
- Zone: Lumbini Zone
- District: Kapilvastu District

Government
  - Type: local level
  - Ward chairperson: [[]]

Population (1991)
  - Total: 3,530
- Time zone: UTC+5:45 (Nepal Time)
- Postal code: 32800

Bhilmi is a village development committee in Kapilvastu District in the Lumbini Zone of southern Nepal. At the time of the 1991 Nepal census, it had a population of 3,530 people living in 535 individual households.
