= Patthardaihiya =

Patthardaihiya पत्थरदहिया
- Village development committee
- Location in Nepal
- Coordinates: 27.60°N 82.82°E
- Country: Nepal
- Zone: Lumbini Zone
- District: Kapilvastu District

Population (1991)
  - Total: 7,598
- Time zone: UTC+5:45 (Nepal Time)

Patthardaihiya is a village development committee in Kapilvastu District in the Lumbini Zone of southern Nepal. At the time of the 1991 Nepal census it had a population of 7598 people living in 1317 individual households.
