= Imiliya =

Coordinates: 27.667°N 82.989°E

Imiliya (Nepali: इमिलिया) is a small town located in the Kapilvastu District, Lumbini Province, Nepal.
