= Pakadi =

Pakadi पकडी
- Village development committee
- Location in Nepal
- Coordinates: 27.54°N 83.15°E
- Country: Nepal
- Zone: Lumbini Zone
- District: Kapilvastu District

Population (1991)
  - Total: 4,555
- Time zone: UTC+5:45 (Nepal Time)

Pakadi is a village development committee in the Kapilvastu District in the Lumbini Zone of southern Nepal. At the time of the 1991 Nepal census it had a population of 4555 people living in 723 individual households.
