= Abhirawa =

Place in Nepal

Abhirao अभिराओ bhaiskunda
- Village development committee
- Location in Nepal
- Coordinates: 27.49°N 83.15°E
- Country: Nepal
- Zone: Lumbini Zone
- District: Kapilvastu District

Population (1991)
  - Total: 4,590
- Time zone: UTC+5:45 (Nepal Time)

Abhirao is a village development committee in Kapilvastu District in the Lumbini Zone of southern Nepal. At the time of the 1991 Nepal census it had a population of 4590 people living in 732 individual households. Under Abhirao VDC, it has Three villages: 1. Bhaiskunda, 2. Bharwaliya, 3. Mankhoriya.2 sepura1
