= Dharampaniya =

Coordinates: 27°32′N 83°07′E

Dharampaniya धरमपानीया
- Village development committee
- Interactive map of Dharampaniya
- Country: Nepal
- Zone: Lumbini Zone
- District: Kapilvastu District

Population (1991)
  - Total: 3,380
- Time zone: UTC+5:45 (Nepal Time)

Dharampaniya is a village development committee in Kapilvastu District in the Lumbini Zone of southern Nepal. At the time of the 1991 Nepal census it had a population of 3380 people living in 533 individual households.
