= Baluhawa =

Baluhawa बलुहवा
- Village development committee
- Location in Nepal
- Coordinates: 27.48°N 83.11°E
- Country: Nepal
- Zone: Lumbini Zone
- District: Kapilvastu District

Population (1991)
  - Total: 3,774
- Time zone: UTC+5:45 (Nepal Time)

Baluhawa is a village development committee in the Kapilvastu District, of the Lumbini Zone, in Nepal. At the time of the 1991 Nepal census, it had a population of 3774 people that were living in 600 individual households.
