= Jahadi =

Jahadi झाडी
- Village development committee
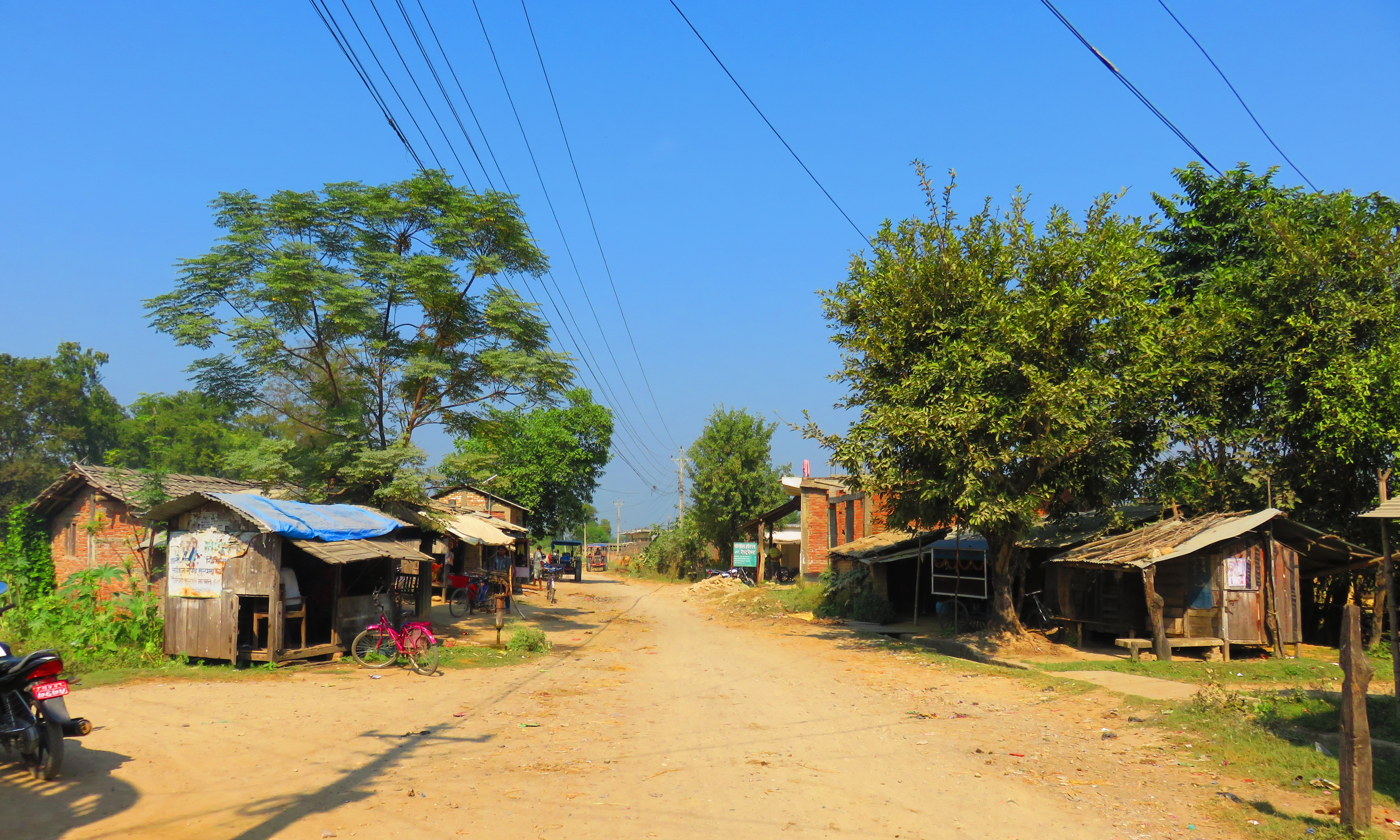
- The main street in Jahadi village

- Location in Nepal
- Coordinates: 27.59°N 83.12°E
- Country: Nepal
- Zone: Lumbini Zone
- District: Kapilvastu District

Population (1991)
  - Total: 4,324
- Time zone: UTC+5:45 (Nepal Time)

Jahadi is a village development committee situated at the southwest corner of Jagdishpur Reservoir, within Kapilvastu District in the Lumbini Zone of southern Nepal. According to the 1991 Nepal census, it was home to a population of 4,324 individuals residing in 708 households.
