= Banganga, Nepal =

Banganga बाणगंगा
- Municipality (नगरपालिका)
- Location in Nepal
- Coordinates: 27.70°N 83.20°E
- Country: Nepal
- Zone: Lumbini
- District: Kapilvastu

Government
  - Mayor: Chakra Pani Aryal (NCP)
  - Deputy Mayor: Rita Kumari Chaudhari (NCP)
- Time zone: UTC+5:45 (NST)
- Website: www.bangangamun.gov.np

Banganga is a municipality in Kapilvastu District in the Lumbini Zone of southern Nepal. Banganga Municipality has total of 233.6 km^{2}. According to the census of 2021 (2078 B. S), total population of the municipality is 96,714 with population density of 414 person per km^{2}. The literacy rate of municipality is highest in the district with 81.9% (male= 88.2%, female =75.6%).

== Headquarter ==
Banganga recently transformed from Village Development Committee to Municipality in 2015 with 11 wards. Hence, the headquarter is in jitpur. However, various municipality works are being done in Gajehada and Jitpur. Jitpur has the main entry gate for the highway running towards south, mainly Taulihawa which is the headquarter of Kapilvastu district. Jitpur is one of the rapidly growing hub in the municipality where many banks and other important businesses are located.

== Municipality government ==
Chakra pani Aryal is the mayor of Banganga municipality and was the Deputy Mayor of the municipality in previous government.

== Media ==
FM radio stations in Banganga Municipality are Heart beat F.M.-91.6 Radio Buddha Awaj - 89.6 MHz, which is a community radio station, Radio Mayadevi 106.1 MHz, and Radio Banganga 90.6 MHz.

== Landscape ==
The Siwalik Hills are particularly prone to landslides due to specific geological factors.

== Border ==
The border of banganga, nepal has been changed due to a dam constructed on the indian side. indian paramilitaries have overseen construction which will lead to an artificial lake in Banganga.
