= Bijaynagar Rural Municipality =

Bijayanagar Rural Municipality विजयनगर गाउँपालिकाको
- Gaunpalika
- Location in Nepal
- Coordinates: 27.606153°N 82.772618°E
- Country: Nepal
- Province: Lumbini Province
- District: Kapilvastu District

Area
  - Total: 173 km^{2} (67 sq mi)

Population
  - Total: 37,013
  - Density: 214/km^{2} (554/sq mi)
- Time zone: UTC+5:45 (Nepal Time)
- Website: http://bijaynagarmun.gov.np/

Bijaynagar Rural Municipality (Nepali :विजयनगर गाउँपालिका) is a Gaunpalika in Kapilvastu District in Lumbini Province of Nepal. On 12 March 2017, the government of Nepal implemented a new local administrative structure, with the implementation of the new local administrative structure, VDCs have been replaced with municipal and Village Councils. Bijaynagar is one of these 753 local units.
