= Shivaraj Municipality =

Shivaraj शिवराज Chandrauta (चन्द्रौटा)
- Municipality (नगरपालिका)
- Location in Nepal
- Coordinates: 27.72°N 82.88°E
- Country: Nepal
- Province: Lumbini
- District: Kapilvastu

Government
  - Mayor: Ajay Thapa (RPP)
  - Deputy Mayor: Shiva Kumari Chaudhary (NCP)

Population (2021)
  - Total: 84,810
- Time zone: UTC+5:45 (NST)
- Website: www.shivarajmun.gov.np

Shivaraj is a Municipality in Kapilvastu District in the Lumbini Zone of southern Nepal. The former village development committee was transformed into Municipality from 18 May 2014 by merging the existing Birpur, Chanai, Bishunpur, Jawabhari and Shivapur village development committees. At the time of the 2021 Nepal census it had a population of 84,810 people living in 16,241 individual households.

To promote local culture Shivapur has one FM radio stations Radio Voice – 104.5 MHz, which is a Community radio Station. For the better help another frequency modulation radio has been running with a name, Shivraj FM. It has been giving information about local activities, news and program. Chandrauta is one of the reputed cities located in Shivraj municipality.
