= Mahendrakot =

Mahendrakot महेन्द्रकोट
- Village development committee
- Location in Nepal
- Coordinates: 27.71°N 83.05°E
- Country: Nepal
- Zone: Lumbini Zone
- District: Kapilvastu District

Population (1991)
  - Total: 5,367
- Time zone: UTC+5:45 (Nepal Time)

Mahendrakot is a village development committee in Kapilvastu District in the Lumbini Zone of southern Nepal. At the time of the 1991 Nepal census it had a population of 5367 people living in 901 individual households.
