= Kopawa =

Kopawa कोपवा
- Village development committee
- Location in Nepal
- Coordinates: 27.66°N 83.12°E
- Country: Nepal
- Zone: Lumbini Zone
- District: Kapilvastu District

Population (2011 A.D)
  - Total: 10,530
- Time zone: UTC+5:45 (Nepal Time)

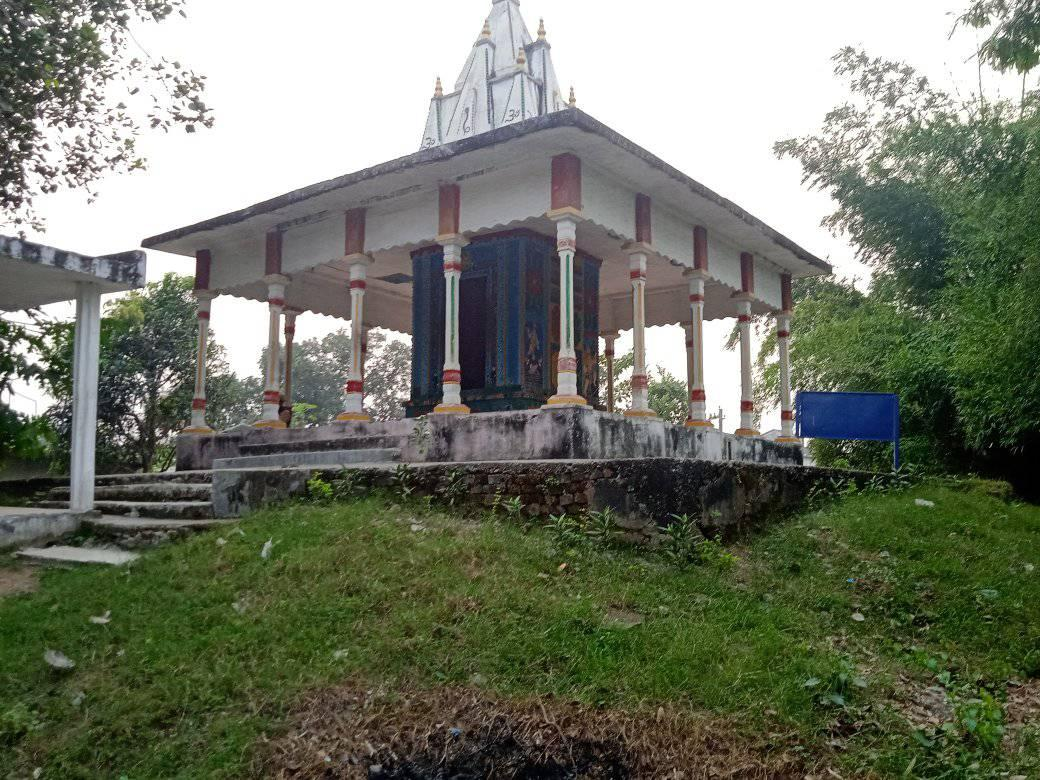
kopawa Shivawala mandir shiva temple

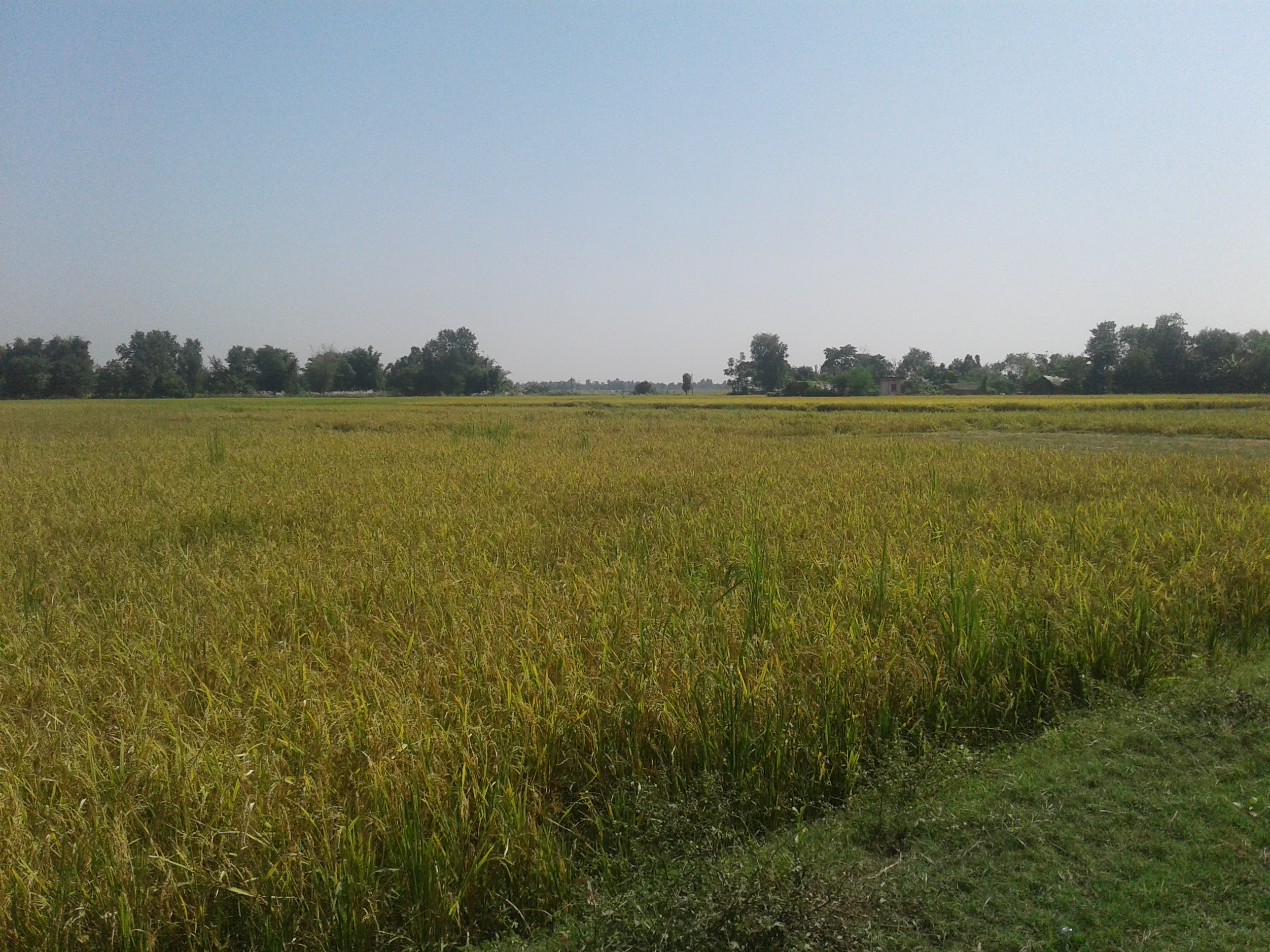
kopawa village land

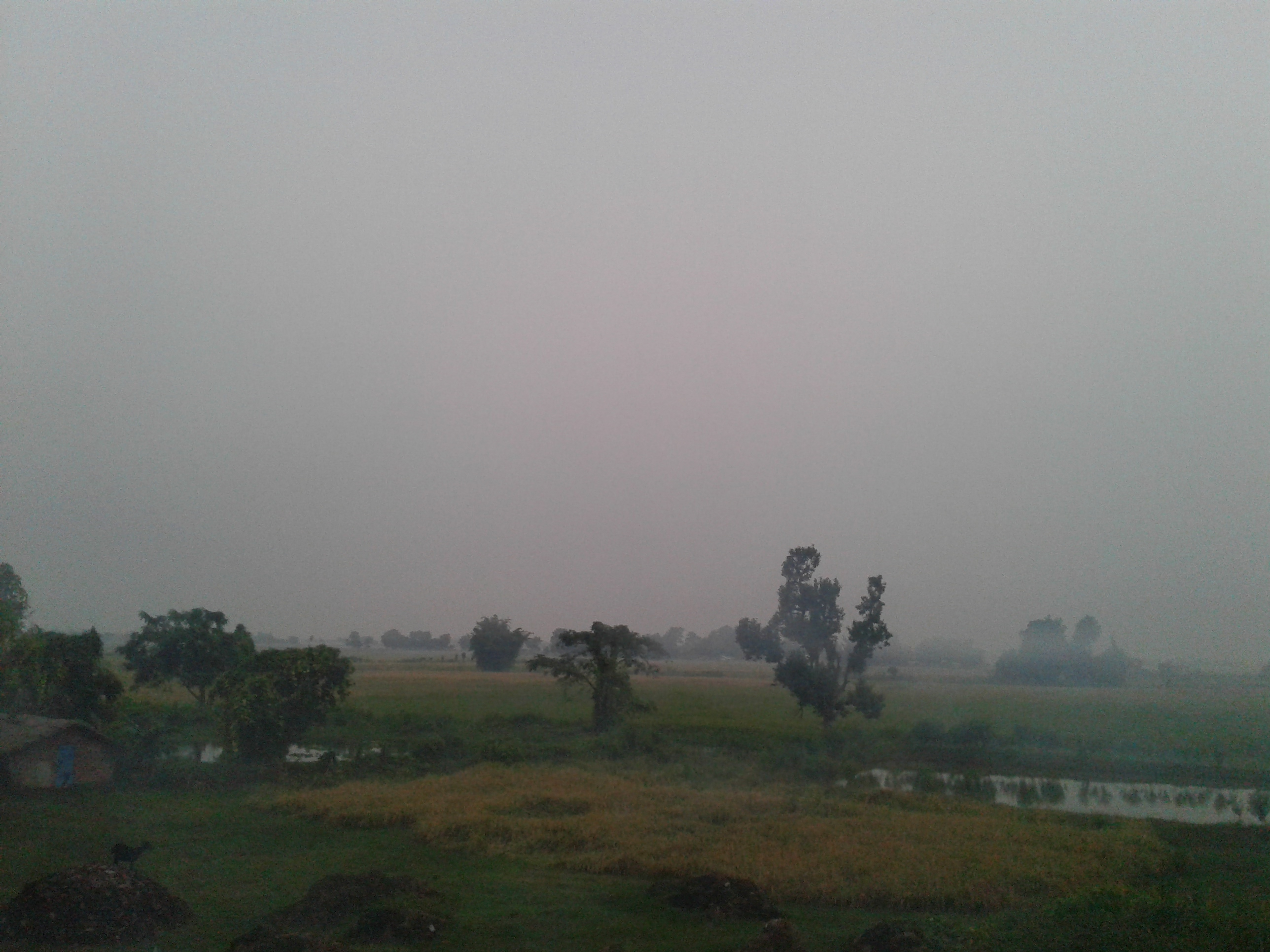
Beautiful kopawa

Kopawa is a village development committee in Kapilvastu District in the Lumbini Zone of southern Nepal. At the time of the 1991 Nepal census it had a population of 7269 people living in 1142 individual households. Now from 2073 B.S. Kopawa is mixed with Banganga municipality ward no. 11.

At the time 2011 A.D total population of Kopawa V.D.C was 10,530. Male=4,889 Female=5,641 and total number of Households=2,142 Data Source:C central Bureau of Statistics government of Nepal.

== Villages of Kopawa V.D.C ==
Kopawa, Semarkhor, Aurahiya, Baidauli, Suthauli, Bankasiya, Amauli, Laxmanghaat, Jhanda, Madhauliya, Maateria, Manohrapur, Partidanda, Bhaglapur

== Government offices in Kopawa ==
1. Kopawa V.D.C office 2. Post office 3. police station 4. Health post 5. Agriculture office
