= Jayanagar, Kapilvastu =

Jayanagar जयनगर
- Village development committee
- Location in Nepal
- Coordinates: 27.65°N 83.06°E
- Country: Nepal
- Zone: Lumbini Zone
- District: Kapilvastu District

Population (1991)
  - Total: 5,886
- Time zone: UTC+5:45 (Nepal Time)

Jayanagar is a village development committee in Kapilvastu District in the Lumbini Zone of southern Nepal. At the time of the 1991 Nepal census it had a population of 5886. The government of Nepal has integrated Jayanagar, Mahendrakot and Dubiya village development committees into Buddhanhumi municipality.

Jayanagar means "Victory Town".
