= Bangai, Rupandehi =

Bangai बनगाई
- Village Development Committee
- Country: Nepal
- Province: Lumbini Province
- District: Rupandehi District

Population (1991)
  - Total: 5,967
- Time zone: UTC+5:45 (Nepal Time)

Bangai is a Village Development Committee in Rupandehi District in Lumbini Province of southern Nepal. At the time of the 1991 Nepal census it had a population of 5967 people residing in 917 individual households.
