= Ramagrama stupa =

Stupa in the Parasi District of Nepal

- रामग्राम स्तूप
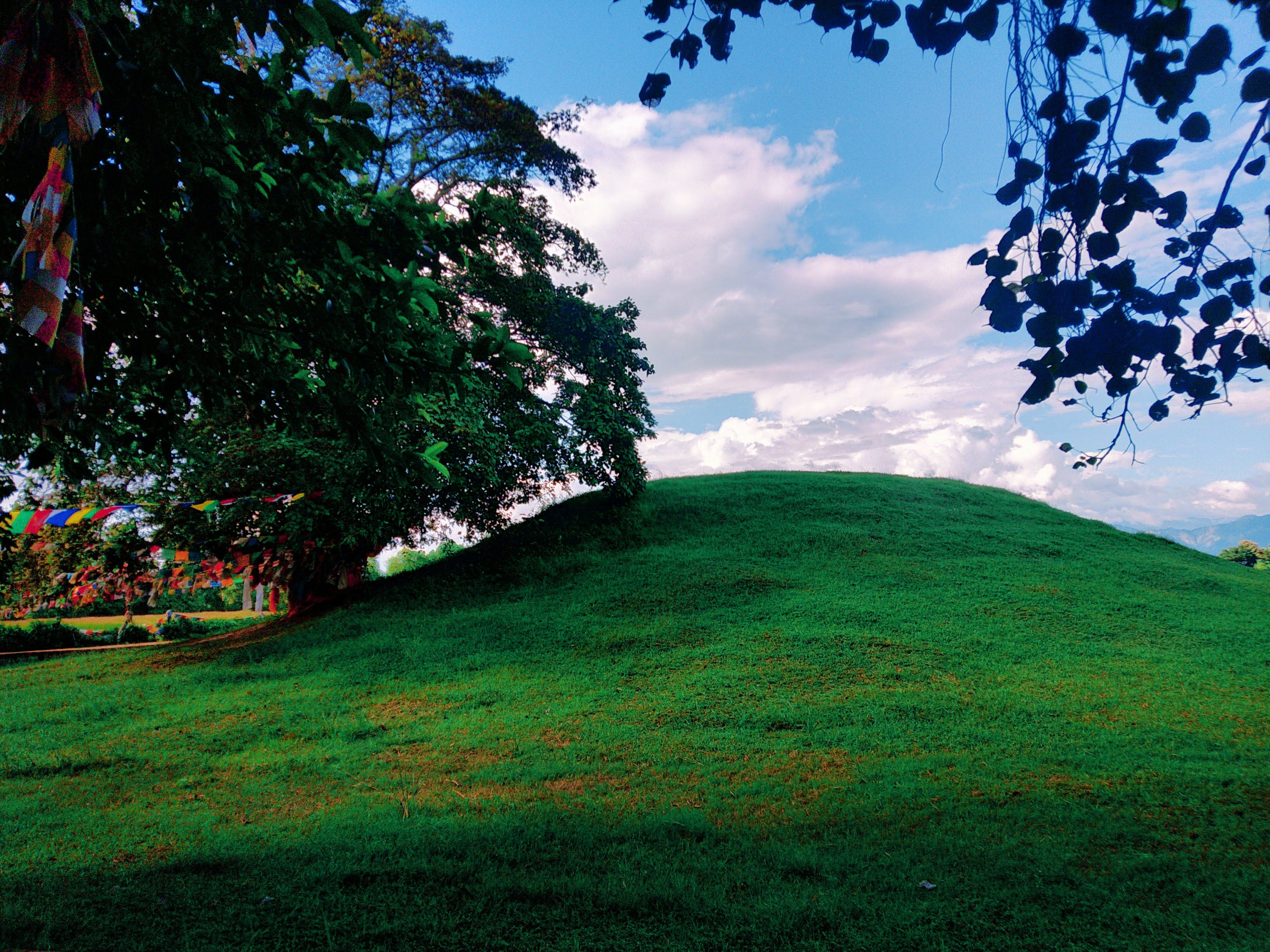
- View of Ramagrama stupa

- Location in Ramgram, Nepal

Religion
- Affiliation: Buddhism
- Sect: Theravada Buddhism
- Status: Preserved

Location
- Location: Ramgram, Parasi District, Lumbini Province, Nepal
- Coordinates: 27°29′52″N 83°40′52″E

Architecture
- Type: Stupa
- Style: Buddhist, Gupta

Specifications
- Length: 50 metres (160 ft)
- Width: 50 metres (160 ft)
- Materials: brick and earth

Ramagrama stupa (Nepali: रामग्राम स्तूप, also Ramgram, Rāmgrām, Rāmagrāma) is a stupa located in Ramgram Municipality, in the Parasi District of Nepal. This Buddhist pilgrimage site containing relics of Gautama Buddha was constructed between the Mauryan and Gupta periods, according to research by Nepal's Department of Archaeology.

== History ==
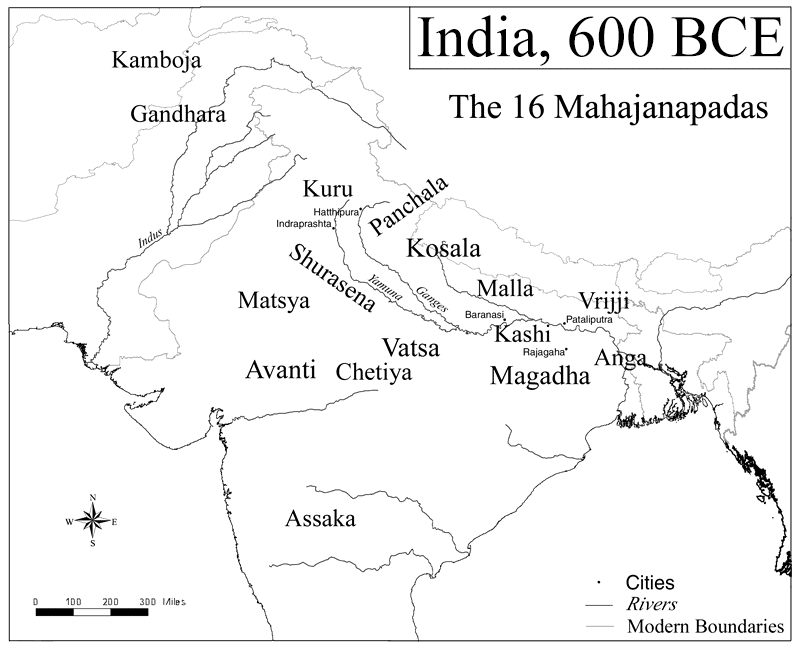
The Malla Mahajanapada

Gautama Buddha's parents were from two different mahājanapadās (kingdoms) of the Solar dynasty — his father (Śuddhodana) belonged to the Shakya kingdom, while his mother (Maya) was from the Koliya kingdom. According to Buddhist texts, after Buddha's Mahaparinirvana, his cremated remains were divided and distributed among the princes of eight of the sixteen mahājanapadās. Each of the princes constructed a stupa at or near his capital city, within which the respective portion of the ashes was enshrined. These eight stupas were located at:

1. Allakappa, a settlement of the Bulī people. The precise location of this place is not currently known.
2. Kapilavastu, capital city of the Shakya kingdom (the location of this stupa is the subject of some controversy; there is evidence it was actually constructed at Piprahwa)
3. Kusinārā, capital city of one of the two Malla republics
4. Pāvā, capital city of the other Malla republics
5. Rājagaha a major city of the Magadha kingdom
6. Rāmagrāma, a major city of the Koliya kingdom (this settlement is sometimes referred to as Koliyanagara)
7. Vesāli, capital city of the Vajjika League
8. Veṭhadīpa, a settlement of Veṭhadīpaka Brahmins. The precise location of this place is not currently known.

About three centuries later, Emperor Ashoka sought to remove the relics from all of these eight original stupas, with the intent to distribute them among 84,000 new stupas to be constructed in his kingdom to honor the memory of the Buddha. According to Mahavamsa, when Ashoka reached the Ramagrama stupa, he encountered a powerful Nāga (mythological hybrid creature, part-human and part-snake) that was guarding the stupa, preventing him from removing the relics. This is why the Ramagrama stupa is the only undisturbed stupa of the original eight stupas.

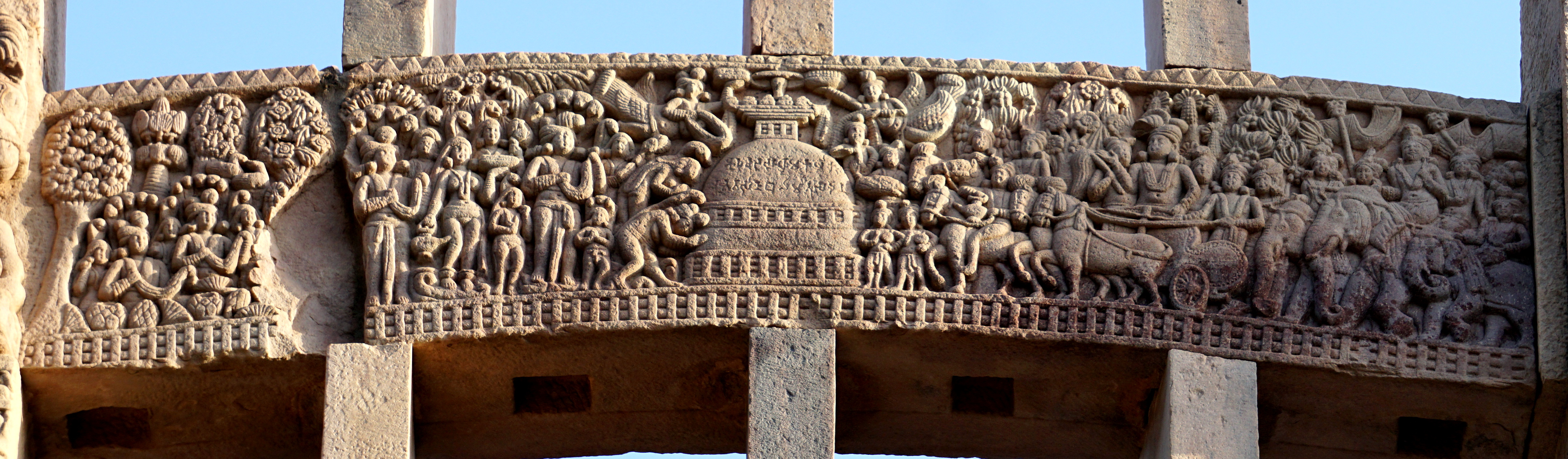
Ashoka (right) visits the Ramagrama Stupa (center), at his failed attempt to take relics of the Buddha from the king (left)

According to the Mahavamsa and other Theravāda Buddhist textual traditions, a major flood caused significant structural damage to the Ramagrama stupa and the reliquary containing the Buddha’s corporeal relics was swept away by the river’s current. These relics were subsequently recovered by the nāgas, who are described in Buddhist tradition as having enshrined and venerated them within their realm. It is further stated that in 140 BCE, the Buddhist sangha transported these sacred relics to Sri Lanka, where they were enshrined in the Ruwanwelisaya stupa constructed by King Dutugamunu.

== Archaeological research ==
The Ramagrama Stupa is believed by Nepalese archaeologists to be the only intact original stupa enshrining the relics of the Buddha. It has been an object of great reverence and a pilgrimage site since its original construction. The 7-metre-high (23 ft) stupa is now buried under a mound of earth and is awaiting further research. The dimensions of the stupa complex are 10m high and 23.5m in diameter. A geophysical survey revealed a perfect quadrangular Kushan era monastery buried below the surface, whose dense concentration of brick prevented crops from growing, leading to the area being known as an "unlucky field". The core structure of the stupa, presumably containing the relics, remains unexcavated.

== Conservation and enhancement ==
The Promised Land and The Lumbini Development Trust signed a Memorandum of Understanding on October 23, 2023, dedicated to the protection, preservation, conservation, development, and management of the Ramagrama Stupa with the support from Moksha Foundation. This was undertaken by Lharkyal Lama who is currently the vice-chairman of the Lumbini Development Trust.

On December 12, 2023, Ramagrama hosted a gathering for the World Peace Program. Graced by the Right Honorable Pushpa Kamal Dahal (Prachanda), the Prime Minister of Nepal, renowned architect Stefano Boeri unveiled the masterplan for the Conservation and Enhancement of the Ramagrama Stupa.

== World Heritage status ==
This site was added to the World Heritage Tentative List by UNESCO on May 23, 1996 in the Cultural category.

== Gallery ==
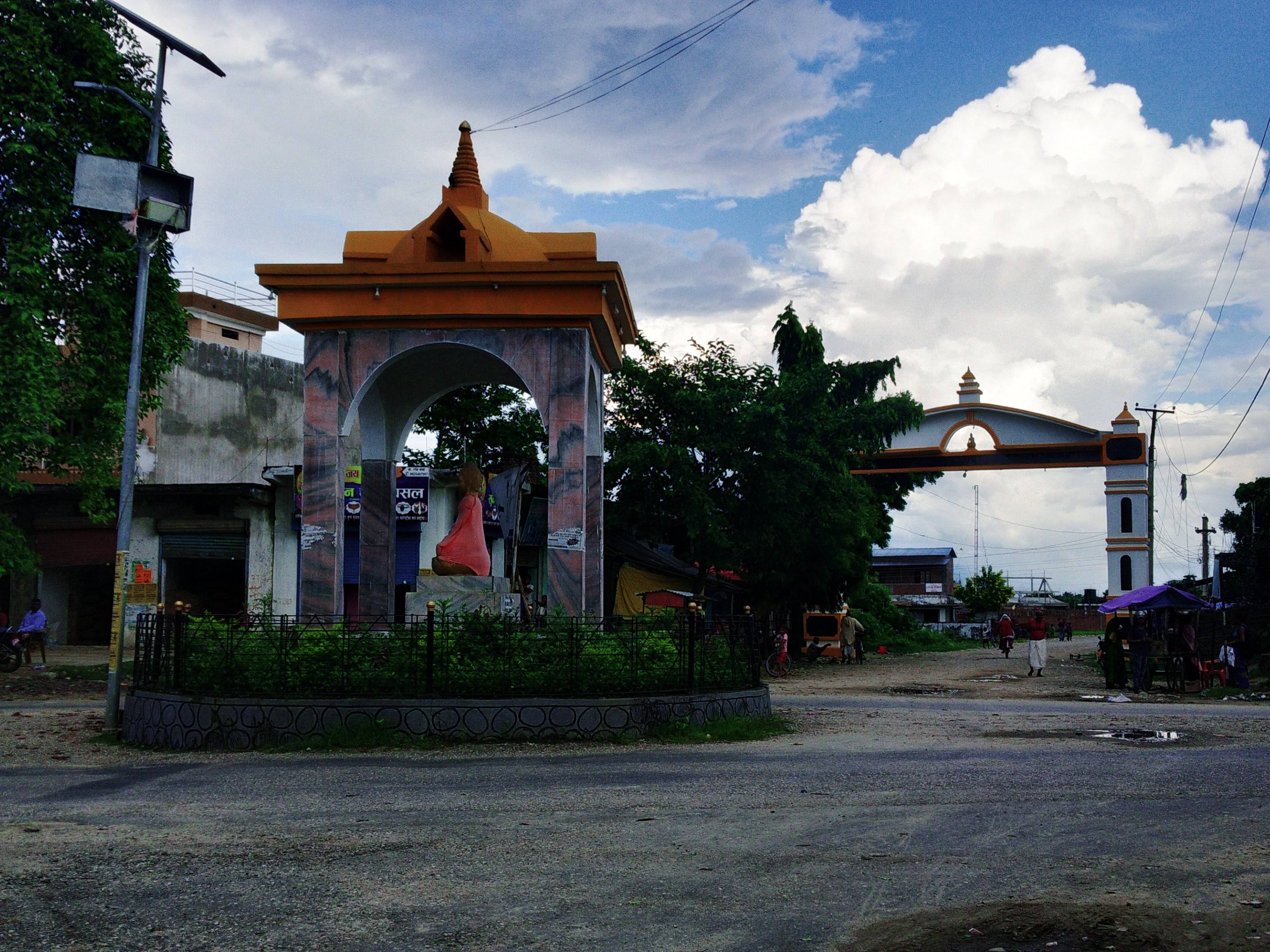
Statue and entrance gate at Ramagrama stupa, Parasi district, Nepal

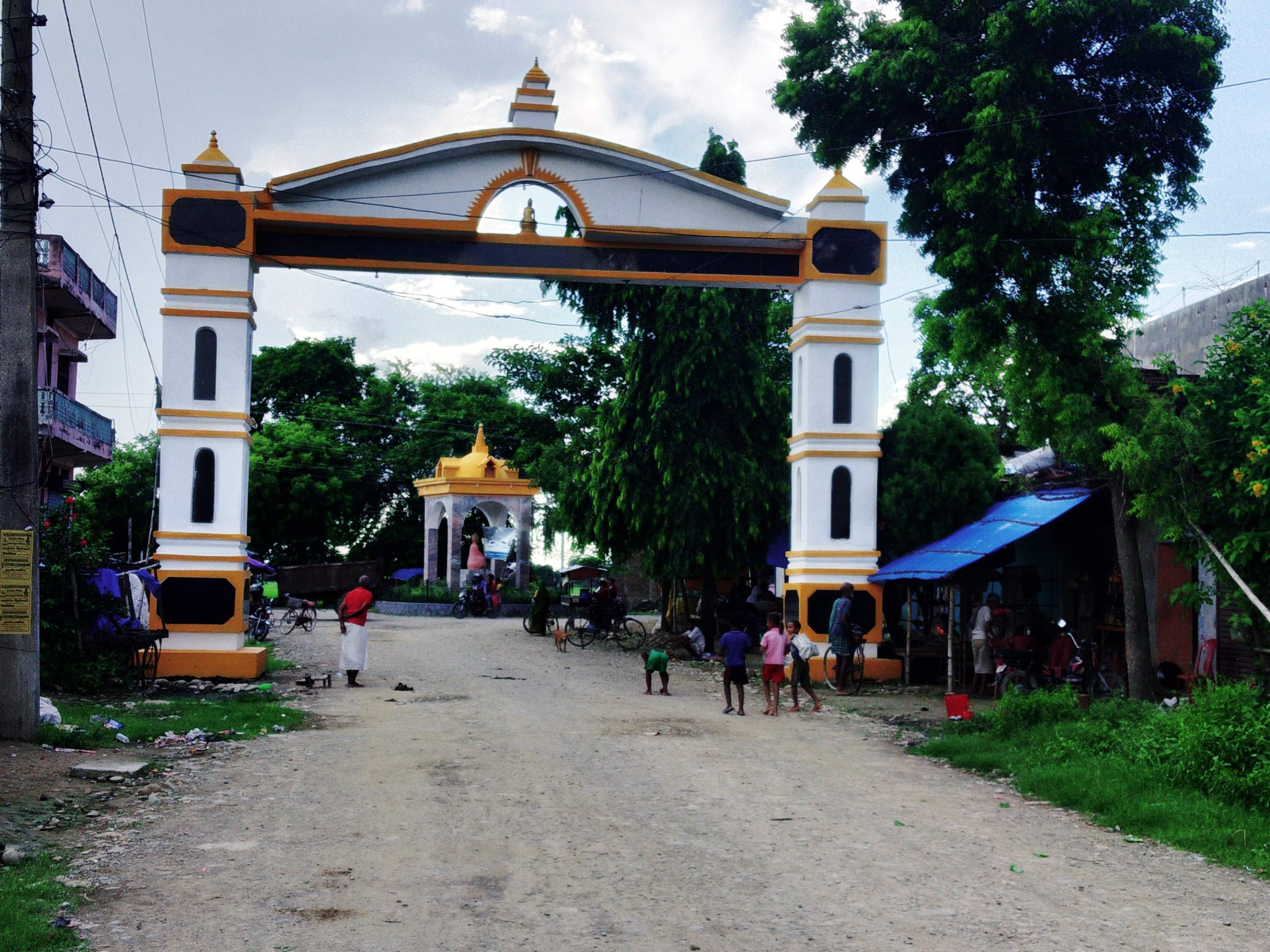
Statue and entrance gate at Ramagrama stupa

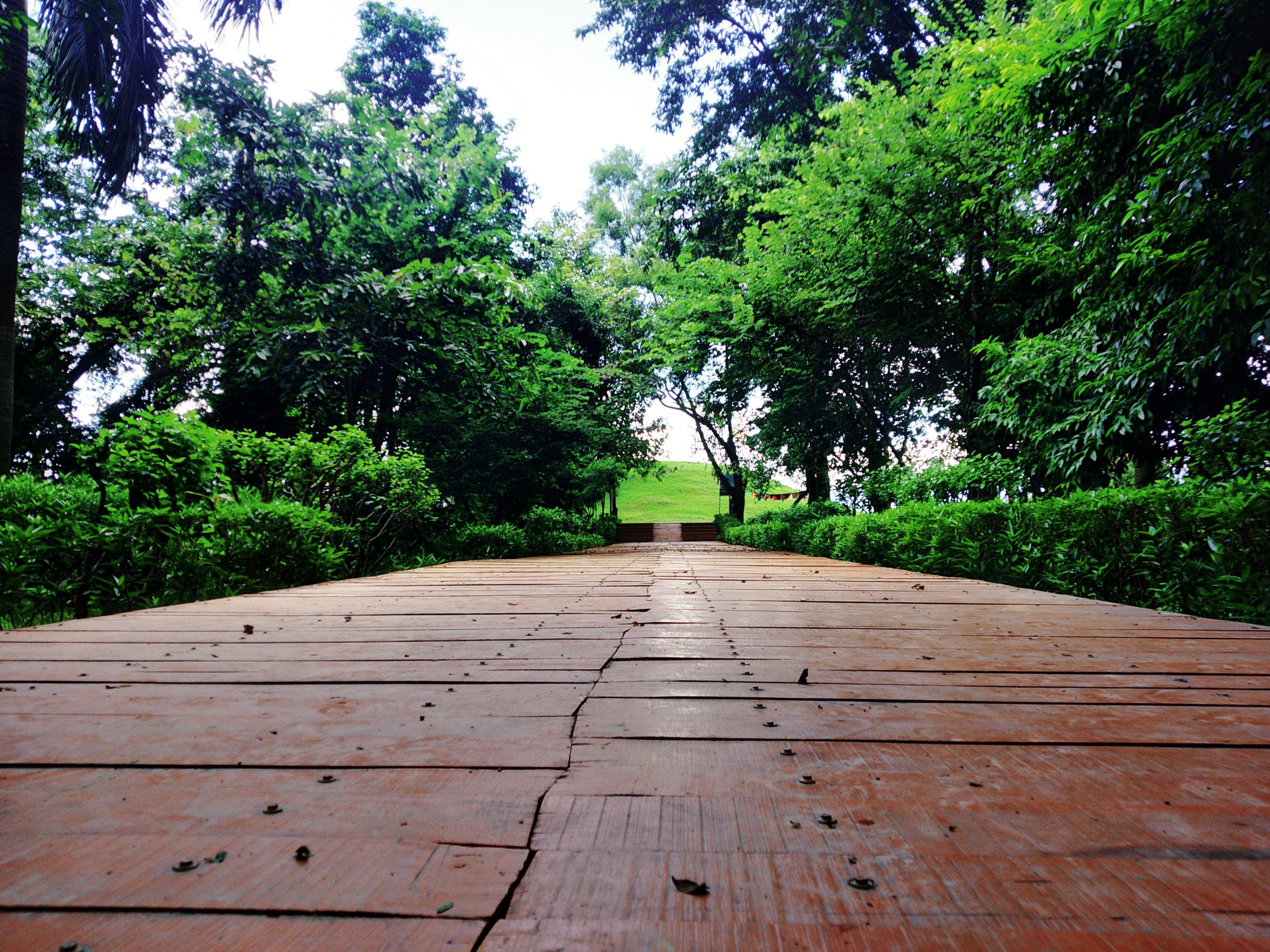
Pathway leading to Ramagrama stupa

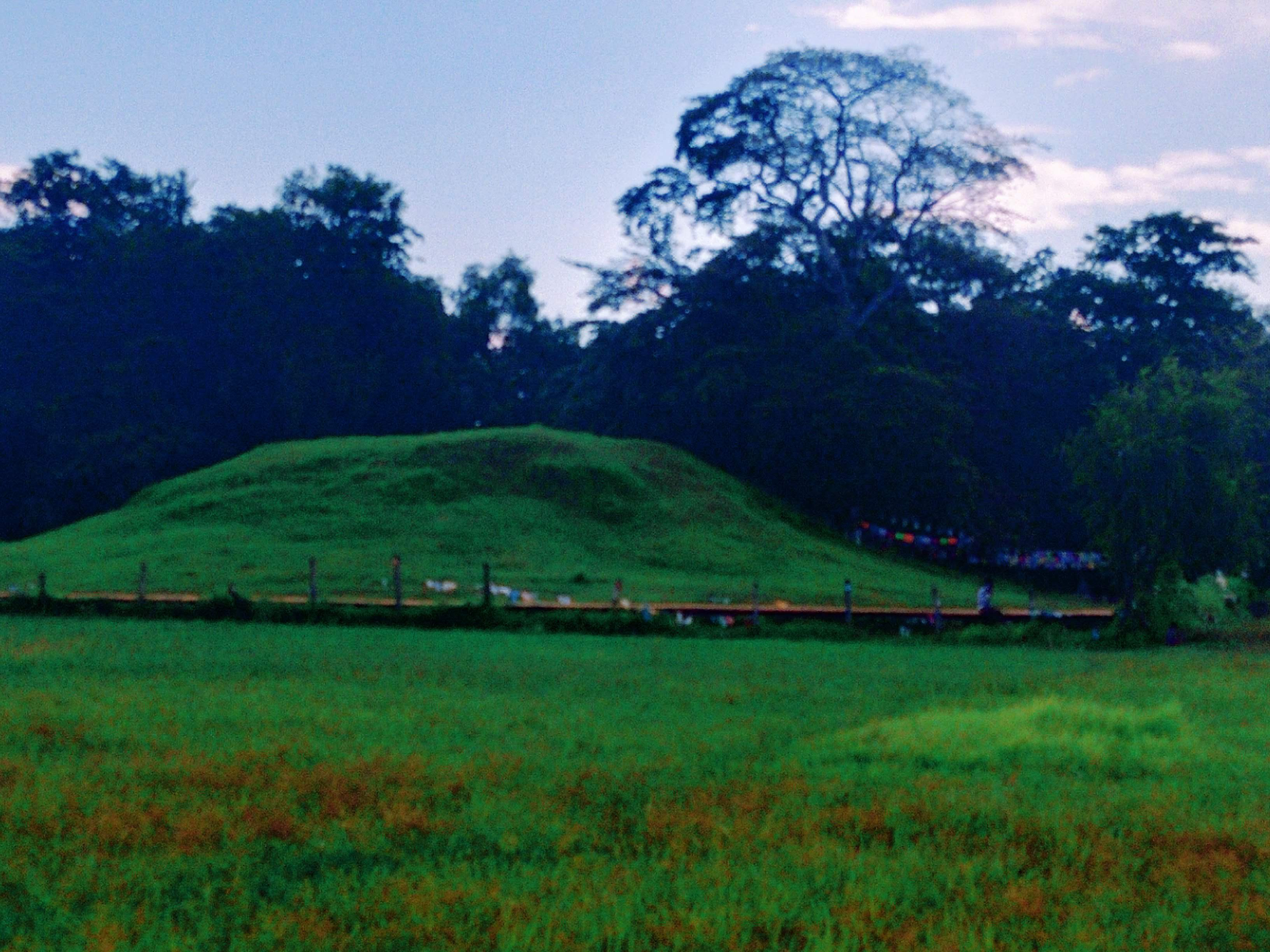
View of Ramagrama stupa

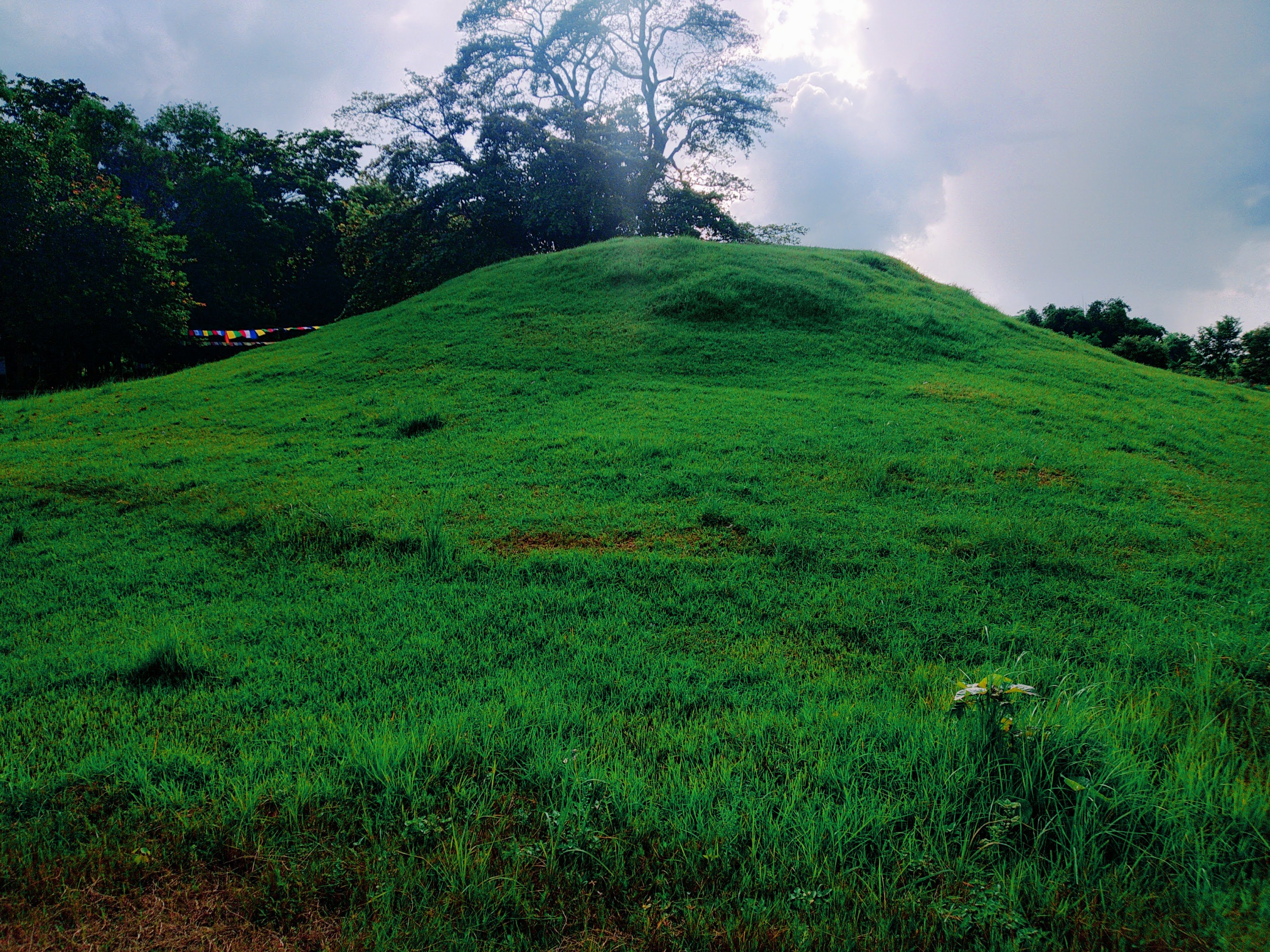
View of Ramagrama stupa

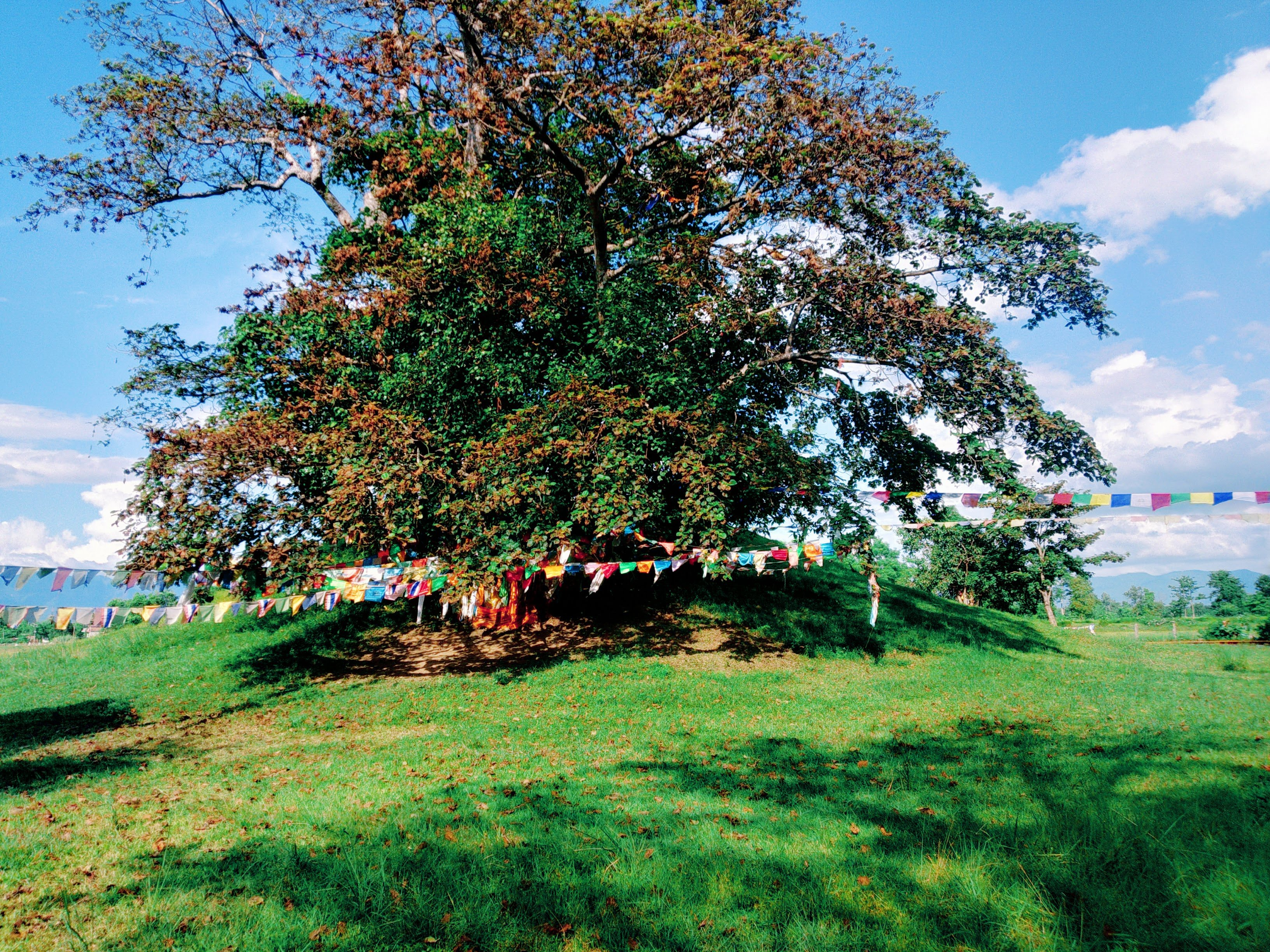
Sacred Bodhi tree (Ficus religiosa) at Ramagrama stupa

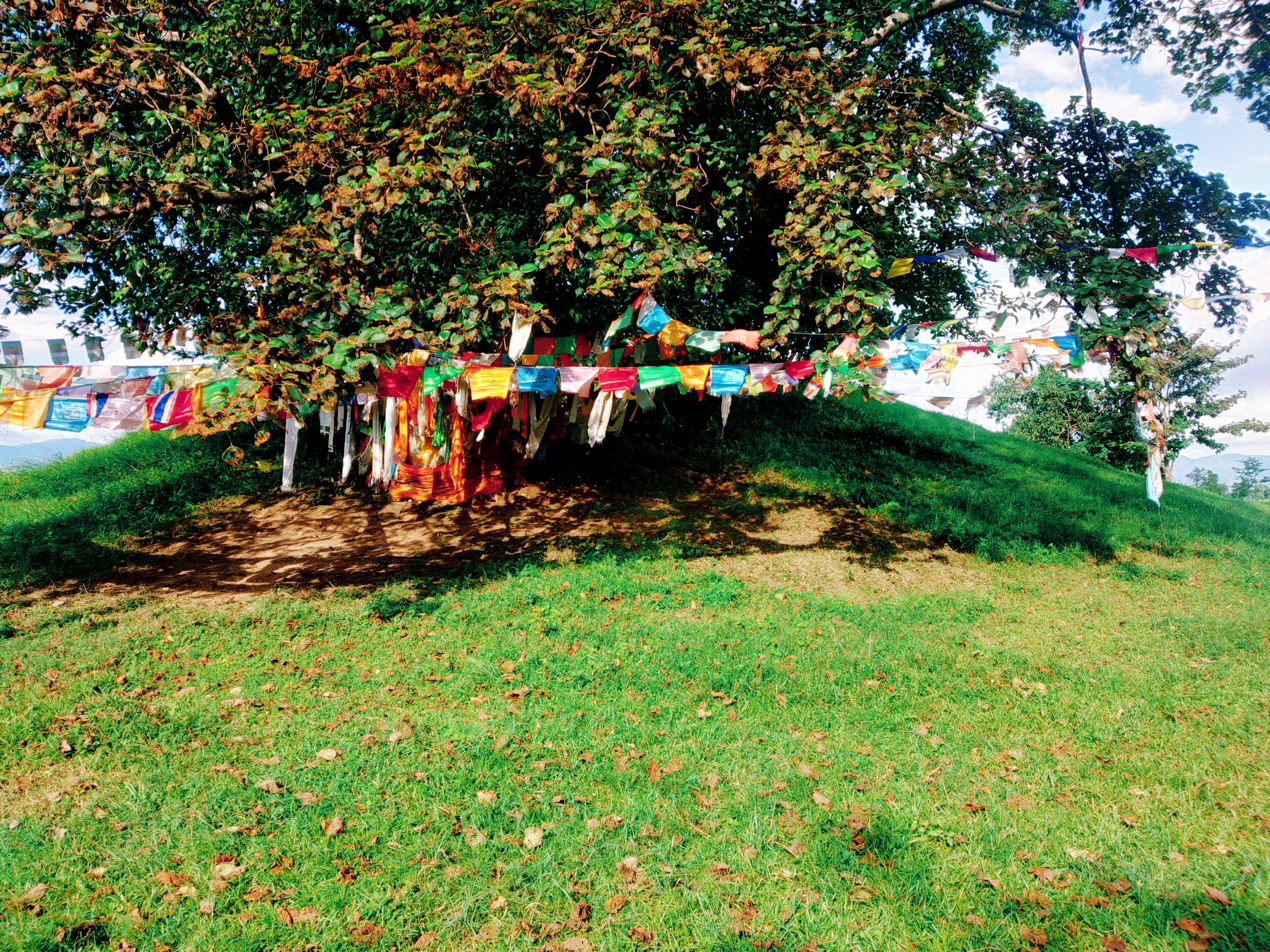
Sacred Bodhi tree at Ramagrama stupa

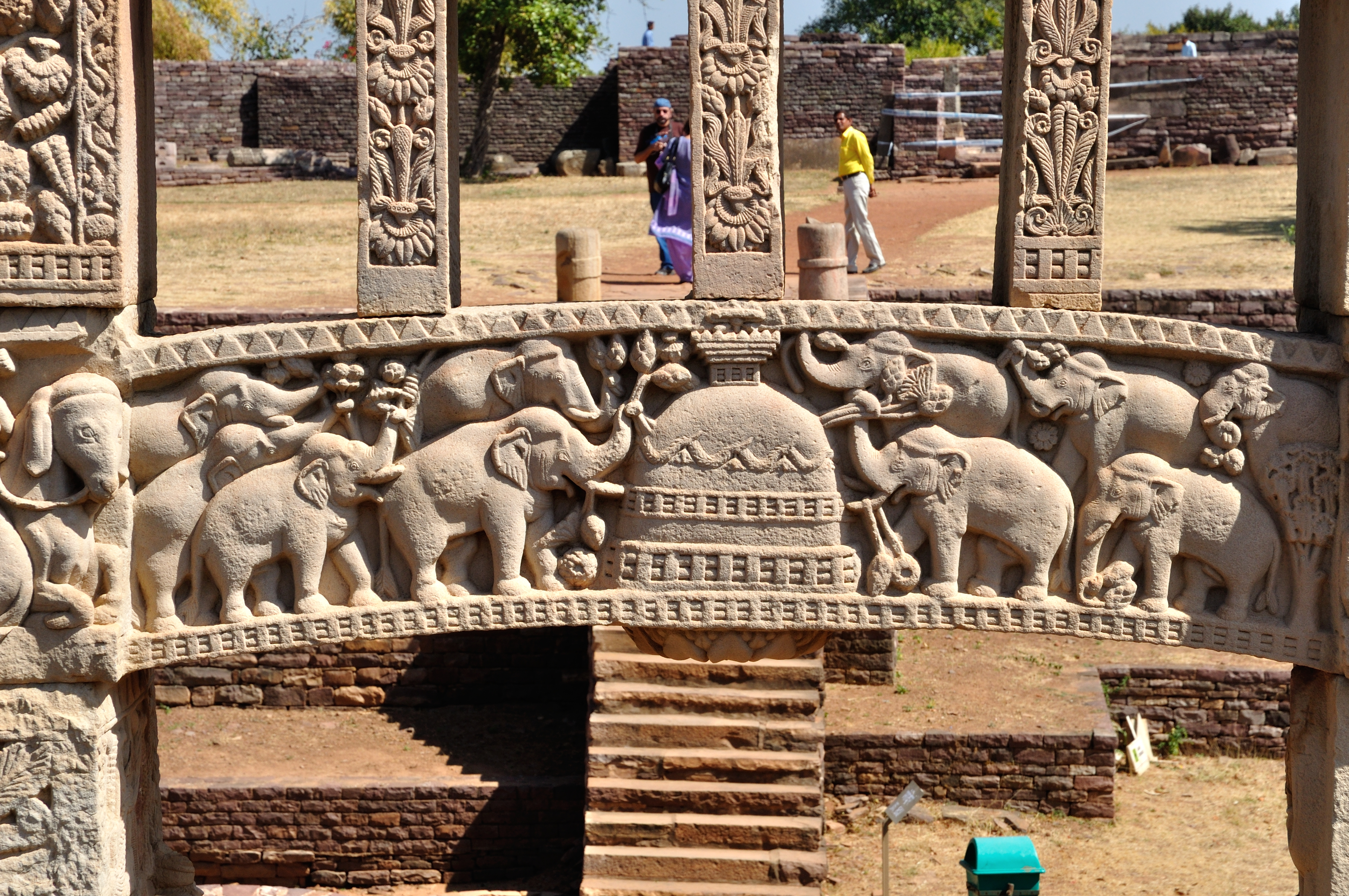
A bas-relief of the Ramagrama stupa, from the east gateway of Great Stupa at Sanchi, in Raisen District of the State of Madhya Pradesh, India

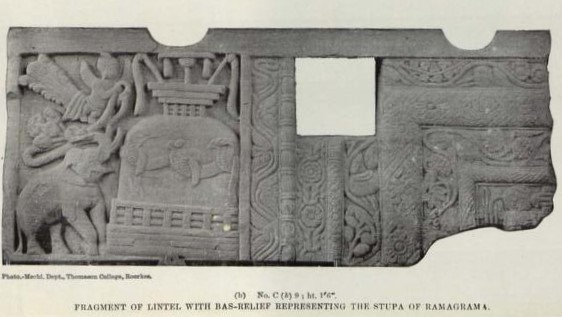
A bas-relief of the Ramagrama stupa, from the Catalogue of the Museum of Archaeology at Sarnath in 1914

== See also ==
- Relic Stupa of Vaishali
- Relics associated with Buddha
- List of stupas in Nepal
