= Bangai Marchwar =

Bangai बंगाई मर्चवार
- Village
- Motto: [" अहिंसा परमो धर्मः धर्म हिंसा तथैव च: "]
- Country: Nepal
- Province: Lumbini Province
- District: Rupandehi District

Government
  - Type: Republic
  - Land Lord: ( Krishna Nath Shukla (alias Prakash Shukla )

Population (1991)
  - Total: 3,651
- Time zone: UTC+5:45 (Nepal Time)

Bangai is an estate in Rupandehi District in Lumbini Province of southern Nepal.

== Demographics ==
As of the 1991 Nepal census, the estate had a population of 3,651 living in 523 households.

== Economy ==
The people of this village have become relatively wealthy, because a significant part of the young moved to places with better earnings, and sent money home.

== History ==
An ancient building in the center of the village is owned by Shri Krishna Nath Shukla (known as Badka babu). He has been "Gram Pradhan" for 30 years. He is known as Dharm Raj because of his kindness and boldness. The building was once the political headquarters of the Terai region. One of the largest buildings in Nepal, the building has around 150 rooms and is situated in a 12-acre compound. It was constructed in the 18th century. Craftsmen from Benaras came to Nepal to construct it.

Residents are the largest producer of Kala Namak Rice in the region. They enjoy power in Uttar Pradesh as their family members hold senior positions in the Government and Judicial services of India and Nepal.

Bangai Estate was once under the control of Krishna Nath Shukla Zamindar, until democracy was established in Nepal. Their political influence in the Terai region of Nepal and Eastern Uttar Pradesh in districts like Maharajgunj, Siddharthnagar, and Gorakhpur. Shukla's grandson Pramath is active in politics and is a farmer leader and public figure from the Gorakhpur region. He is a member of Bharatiya Janta Party. He has a big organization that includes youths and farmers.
