= Khadawa Bangai =

Khadawa Bangai खद्वा बनगाई
- Village development committee
- Location in Nepal
- Coordinates: 27.65°N 83.37°E
- Country: Nepal
- Province: Lumbini Province
- District: Rupandehi District

Population (1991)
  - Total: 7,788
- Time zone: UTC+5:45 (Nepal Time)

Khadawa Bangai is a village development committee in Rupandehi District in Lumbini Province of southern Nepal. At the time of the 1991 Nepal census it had a population of 7788.
