= Kapilvastu District =

Coordinates: 27°32′N 83°3′E

Kapilvastu District jilla kaplibstu
- District
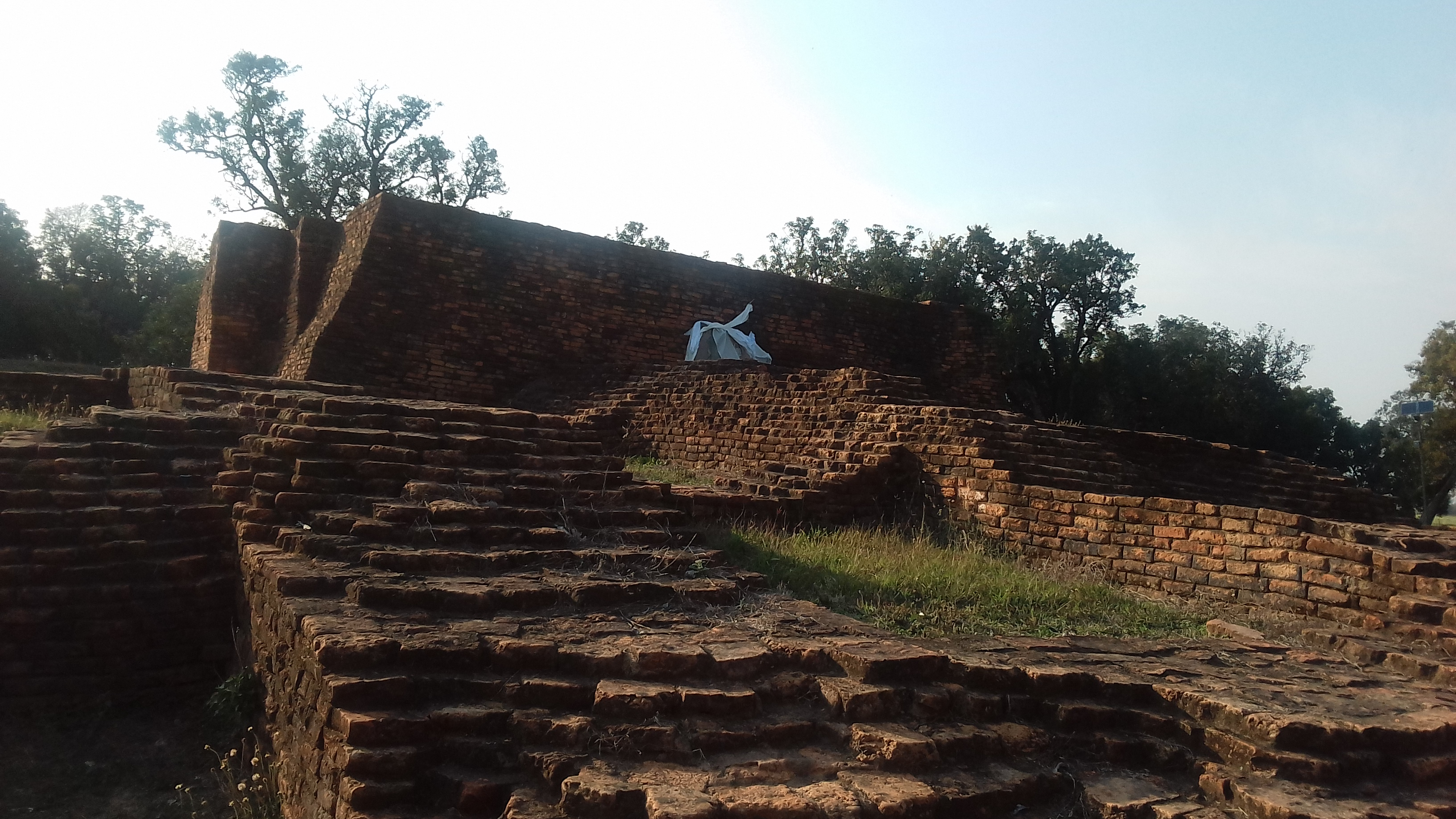
- Tilaurakot, Kapilvastu Ancient Shakya Capital

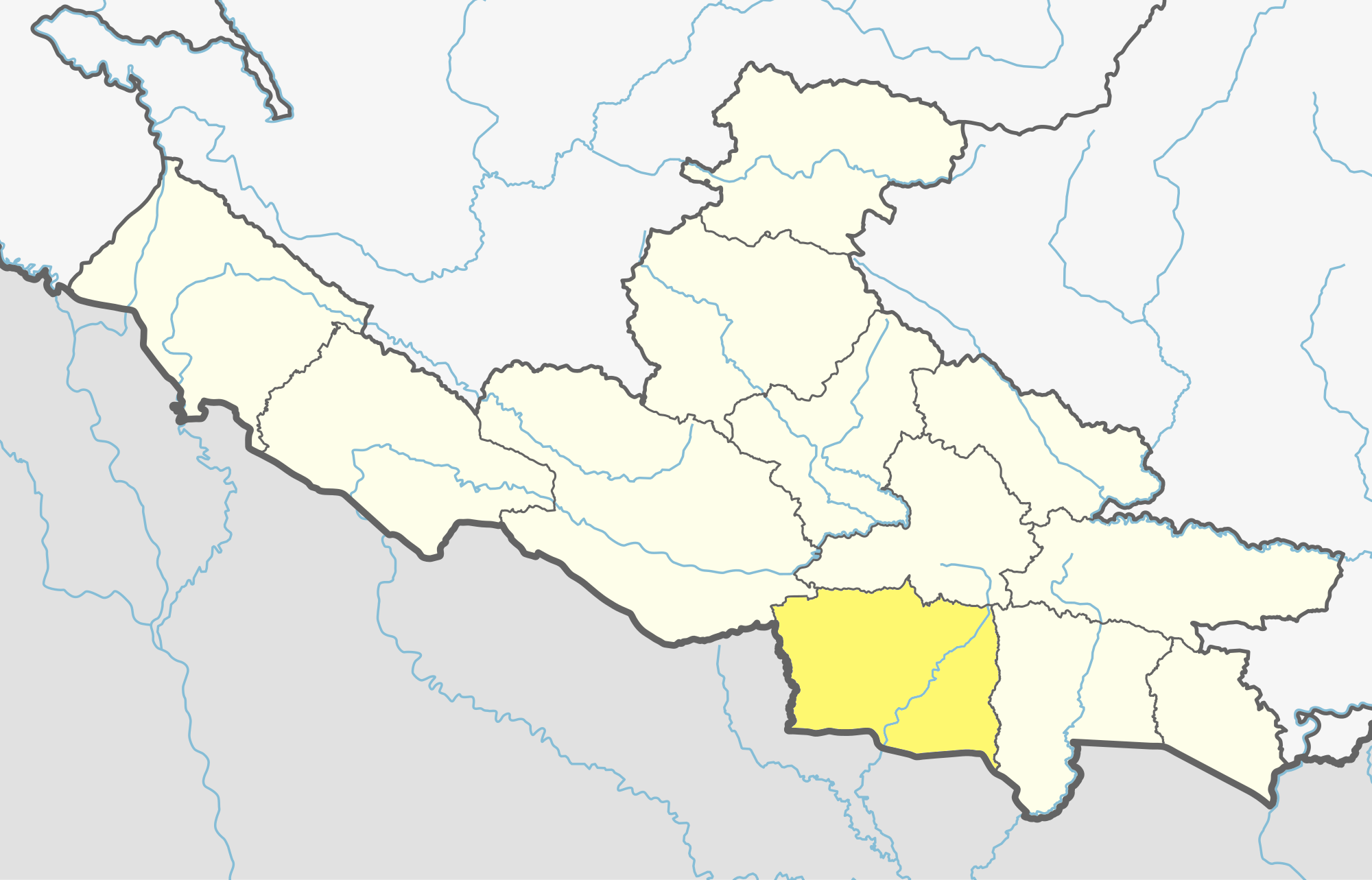
- Location of Kapilvastu (dark yellow) in Lumbini Province
- Country: Nepal
- Province: Lumbini Province

Government
  - Type: Coordination committee
  - Body: DCC, Kapilvastu

Area
  - Total: 1,738 km^{2} (671 sq mi)

Population (2021)
  - Total: 686,739
  - Density: 395.1/km^{2} (1,023/sq mi)
- Time zone: UTC+05:45 (NPT)
- Postal Codes: 67345
- Telephone Code: 076
- Main Language(s): Awadhi, Tharu, Nepali
- Website: www.ddckapilvastu.gov.np

Kapilvastu District (Nepali: कपिलवस्तु जिल्ला [ˈkʌpilbʌstu]), often Kapilbastu, is one of the districts of Lumbini Province, Nepal. The district, with Kapilbastu municipality as its district headquarters, covers an area of 1,738 square kilometres (671 sq mi) and in 2001 had a population of 481,976, which increased to 571,936 in 2011 and later according 2021 census it further increased to 686,739 Kapilvastu district has 3 number of seats for central whereas 6 seats for state level elections.

== Geography and climate ==
The district is situated at a height of 93 to 1,491 metres (305 to 4,892 ft) above sea level. Geographically, the district can be divided into the low land plains of Terai and the low Chure hills.

Kapilvastu is bounded by Rupandehi District to the east, Dang District to the northwest, Arghakhanchi District to the north, Balrampur district, Awadh region, Uttar Pradesh, India to the west and Siddharthnagar district, Purvanchal region, Uttar Pradesh to the south.

Climate zone	Elevation range	% of area
Lower Tropical	below 300 meters (1,000 ft)	86.8%
Upper Tropical	300 to 1,000 meters 1,000 to 3,300 ft.	12.0%
Subtropical	1,000 to 2,000 meters 3,300 to 6,600 ft.	1.2%

The summer is hot with temperature above 40 °C and winter temperature remains below 15 °C. Due to extremely hot and cold climatic conditions, the people suffer from viral fever, dengue, malaria etc. and cold and diarrohea respectively.

== Demographics ==
Historical population
Census year	Pop.	±% p.a.
1981	270,045	—
1991	371,778	+3.25%
2001	481,976	+2.63%
2011	571,936	+1.73%
2021	686,739	+1.85%
Source: Citypopulation

At the time of the 2021 Nepal census, Kapilvastu District had a population of 682,961. 10.05% of the population is under 5 years of age. It has a literacy rate of 71.82% and a sex ratio of 1041 females per 1000 males. 481,661 (70.53%) lived in municipalities.

Ethnic groups/castes in Kapilvastu district (2021)
1. Muslim (17.4%)
2. Tharu (11.0%)
3. Yadav (9.78%)
4. Bahun (7.30%)
5. Kurmi (6.21%)
6. Paswan (4.17%)
7. Chhetri (3.98%)
8. Magar (3.52%)
9. Chamar (3.41%)
10. Terai Brahmin (2.58%)
11. Kahar (2.39%)
12. Kewat (2.31%)
13. Kami (1.88%)
14. Kori (1.88%)
15. Teli (1.86%)
16. Other Madheshi non-Dalit (14.3%)
17. Other Madheshi Dalit (1.94%)
18. Other Khas Dalit (1.23%)
19. Other Khas non-Dalit (0.99%)
20. Others (1.90%)

Muslims are the largest group, making 17% of the population. Khas people are 15% of the population. Tharus are 11% of the population, and Hill Janjati peoples, mostly Magar, made up 4% of the population.[5]

Religion in Kapilvastu District (2021)
Religion	Percent
Hinduism	80.71%
Islam	18.21%
Buddhism	0.74%
Other or not stated	0.34%

Languages of Kapilvastu District (2021)
1. Awadhi (66.9%)
2. Nepali (18.9%)
3. Tharu (10.6%)
4. Urdu (1.28%)
5. Magar (1.10%)
6. Others (1.16%)

At the time of the 2021 census, 66.92% of the population spoke Awadhi, 18.95% Nepali, 10.59% Tharu, 1.28% Urdu and 1.10% Magar as their first language.

== Administration ==
The district consists of ten municipalities, out of which six are urban municipalities and four are rural municipalities. These are as follows:

- Kapilvastu Municipality
- Banganga Municipality
- Buddhabhumi Municipality
- Shivaraj Municipality
- Krishnanagar Municipality
- Maharajgunj Municipality
- Mayadevi Rural Municipality
- Yashodhara Rural Municipality
- Suddhodhan Rural Municipality
- Bijaynagar Rural Municipality

== Economy ==
Most of the population of the district is dependent on agriculture. Paddy rice is a major crop of the district. A number of youths rely on foreign employment while sugarcane is an important cash crop.

Crop	Production in metric tonnes
Paddy	> 150,000
Wheat	25,000-35,000
Sugarcane	> 175,000
Oil seed	1,000-5,000

== Population ==
In 2021 National population and Housing census 2021 was reported that total population of kapilvastu district was 686,739 . Male=337,604 and Female=348604 and number of total household was 101,321 Data source: central bureau of statistics, kathmandu government of Nepal .

== Culture ==
Awadhi people are the major inhabitants of this region, which is very rich in their culture. Awadhi cuisine is well known. Most people of the district follow Sanatana culture and majority of the population is Hindu. Therefore, festivals such as Vijaya Dashami, Deepawali, Holi, Ram Navami and Naag Panchami are very popular. Shivaratri and the month of Shrawana attract huge crowds in the district capital Taulihawa where ancient Tauleshwar Nath Temple exists. Since Kapilvastu was the kingdom of Bhagwan Buddha, Vaishak Purnima is also celebrated in a grand way. The local population including Tharu celebrate Makar Sankranti (Maghi) with festivity. Tharus live in the northern part of the district.

== Places of interest ==
=== World Marsh Region ===
A region with biodiversity, cultural, archaeological and historical monuments that has been proposed to be enlisted in the list of World Cultural Heritage of UNESCO.

=== Archaeological sites ===
More than 138 historical sites related to Buddha have already been identified within the boundary to the east of Banganga, west of Kothi, north to Indian border and south to Mahendra highway. The forest of the district stands as a natural park. The land is irrigated by the rivers like Banganga, Koili, Surai, Chirai, Bhutera and others. The latest archaeological excavation carried out under the aegis of the Department of Archaeology (DoA) has discovered that Kapilvastu has the highest number of archaeological sites in the country. The department has identified 136 archaeological sites in the district.

== See also ==
- People's Progressive Party
- Jagdishpur Lake, Kapilvastu
- Bikuli, Kapilvastu
- Lumbini Province
- Buddha
