= Nigalihawa =

Nigalihawa निगलिहवा
- Village development committee
- Location in Nepal Nigalihawa (South Asia)
- Coordinates: 27.62°N 83.11°E
- Country: Nepal
- Zone: Lumbini Zone
- District: Kapilvastu District

Population (1991)
  - Total: 7,564
- Time zone: UTC+5:45 (Nepal Time)

Nigalihawa is a village development committee in Kapilvastu District in the Lumbini Zone of southern Nepal. At the time of the 1991 Nepal census, it had a population of 7564 people living in 1231 individual households.

== History ==
Nigalihawa was known as Sobhavati in ancient times. According to Theravada Buddhist tradition, Konagamana Buddha was born in Sobhavati. Konagamana Buddha is one of the ancient Buddhas whose biography is chronicled in chapter 23 of the Buddhavamsa, one of the books of the Pali Canon. Today, Sobhavati corresponds to the archaeological site referred to as Nigali Sagar, which is located in Nigalihawa.
