= Lumbini pillar inscription =

Ashoka pillar inscription identifying Buddha's birthplace in Nepal

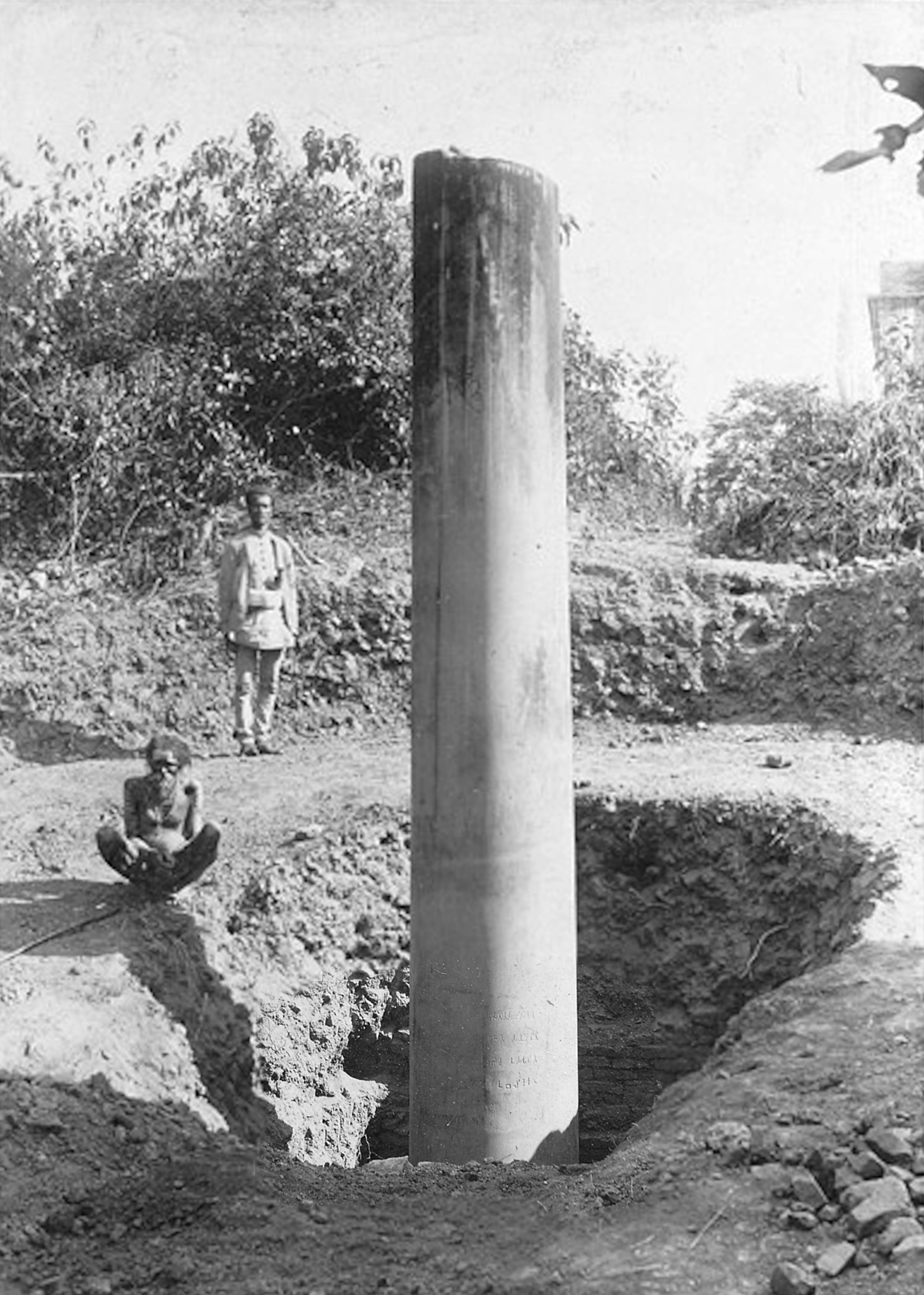
- Excavation of the pillar, and discovery of the inscription at the bottom of the pillar.
- Material: Polished sandstone
- Size: Height: Width:
- Period/culture: 3rd century BCE
- Discovered: 27.469650°N 83.275595°E
- Place: Lumbini, Nepal.
- Present location: Lumbini, Nepal.

Location

The Lumbini pillar inscription, also called the Paderia inscription, is an inscription in the ancient Brahmi script, discovered in December 1896 on a pillar of Ashoka in Lumbini, Nepal by former Chief of the Nepalese Army General Khadga Shamsher Jang Bahadur Rana under the authority of Nepalese government and assisted by Alois Anton Führer. Another famous inscription discovered nearby in a similar context is the Nigali-Sagar inscription. The Lumbini inscription is categorized among the Minor Pillar Edicts of Ashoka, and is a commemoration of his visit in the area. Lumbini was made a World Heritage Site by UNESCO in 1997.

== Discovery of the pillar ==
Ancient historical records of the Buddhist monuments of the region, made by the ancient Chinese monk-pilgrim Faxian in the early 5th century CE and by another ancient Chinese monk-pilgrim Xuanzang in the 7th century CE, had been used in an effort to search for the place of birth of Gautama Buddha, said to be in Lumbini, and his ancient city of Kapilavastu. The Lumbini pillar itself, set up where the Buddha was born, was mentioned by Xuanzang, who said that it was surmounted by the sculpture of a horse and that it had been broken in half, but he never mentioned the presence of an inscription, which, according to Vincent A. Smith, may already have been hidden by the time he visited in the 7th century. The description by Xuanzang adds that the pillar was split in two and fallen on the ground at the time he saw it.

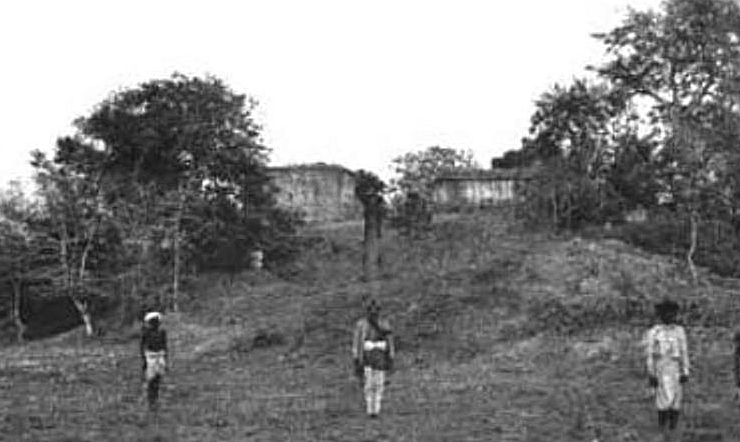
View of the ruins and the Lumbini pillar from the West in 1901

The pillar was supported underground by a brick base, which according to Vincent A. Smith had to be of a comparatively more recent date. He suggested that the fallen pillar had been re-erected at the time of the Buddhist Pala dynasty, in the 11th or 12th century.

The existence of the stone pillar itself was already known before the discovery: it had already been reported to Vincent A. Smith by a local landowner named Duncan Ricketts, around twelve years before (circa 1884). Rubbings of the medieval inscriptions on top of the pillar had been sent by Ricketts, but they were thought of no great consequence. Führer has also heard about the pillar in 1895, while he was investigating the nearby Nigali Sagar pillar.

== Discovery of the inscription (1896) ==
In December 1896, Alois Anton Führer was making a follow-up survey of the nearby Nigali-Sagar pillar, discovered and investigated by him the previous year, in March 1895.

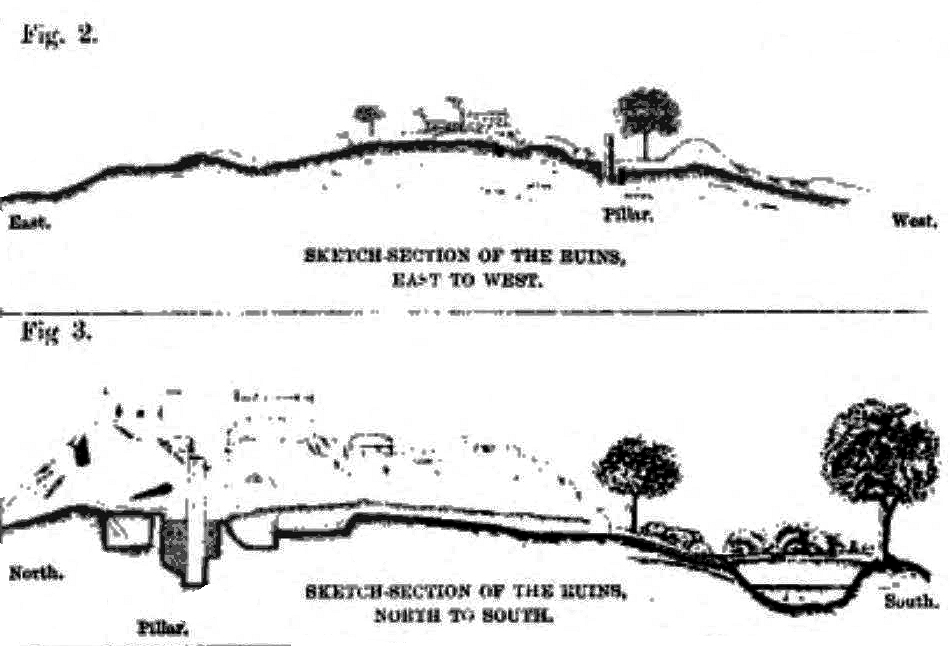
Lumbini pillar ruins, cross-section of the site as of 1901.

According to some accounts, Führer found the Lumbini pillar on December 1, and then asked the help of local commander, General Khadga Shumsher Rana, to excavate it. According to other accounts General Khadga Samsher Rana knew the location of the pillar and led Führer to it. Reportedly, Führer was not present when the inscription was discovered, as he arrived only "a little later", but Ricketts was witness to it. Initially, only the top of the pillar was visible, with a medieval inscription on it. The Nepalese authorities dug around the pillar, to find the ancient Brahmi inscription, which therefore had remained underground, hidden from view.

The Brahmi inscription on the pillar gives evidence that Ashoka, emperor of the Maurya Empire, visited the place in 3rd-century BCE and identified it as the birth-place of the Buddha. The inscription was translated by Paranavitana: (Note: Several alternative translations have been published.)

Rummindei pillar, inscription of Ashoka
Translation
(English)

When King Devanampriya Priyadarsin had been anointed twenty years, he came himself and worshipped (this spot) because the Buddha Shakyamuni was born here. (He) both caused to be made a stone bearing a horse (?) and caused a stone pillar to be set up, (in order to show) that the Blessed One was born here. (He) made the village of Lummini free of taxes, and paying (only) an eighth share (of the produce).

— The Rummindei Edict, one of the Minor Pillar Edicts of Ashoka.

Transliteration
(original Brahmi script)

𑀤𑁂𑀯𑀸𑀦𑀁𑀧𑀺𑀬𑁂𑀦 𑀧𑀺𑀬𑀤𑀲𑀺𑀦 𑀮𑀸𑀚𑀺𑀦 𑀯𑀻𑀲𑀢𑀺𑀯𑀲𑀸𑀪𑀺𑀲𑀺𑀢𑁂𑀦
Devānaṃpiyena Piyadasina lājina vīsati-vasābhisitena
𑀅𑀢𑀦 𑀆𑀕𑀸𑀘 𑀫𑀳𑀻𑀬𑀺𑀢𑁂 𑀳𑀺𑀤 𑀩𑀼𑀥𑁂 𑀚𑀸𑀢 𑀲𑀓𑁆𑀬𑀫𑀼𑀦𑀻 𑀢𑀺
atana āgāca mahīyite hida Budhe jāte Sakyamuni ti
𑀲𑀺𑀮𑀸 𑀯𑀺𑀕𑀥𑀪𑀺 𑀘𑀸 𑀓𑀸𑀳𑀸𑀧𑀺𑀢 𑀲𑀺𑀮𑀸𑀣𑀪𑁂 𑀘 𑀉𑀲𑀧𑀸𑀧𑀺𑀢𑁂
silā vigaḍabhī cā kālāpita silā-thabhe ca usapāpite
𑀳𑀺𑀤 𑀪𑀕𑀯𑀁 𑀚𑀸𑀢 𑀢𑀺 𑀮𑀼𑀁𑀫𑀺𑀦𑀺𑀕𑀸𑀫𑁂 𑀉𑀩𑀮𑀺𑀓𑁂 𑀓𑀝𑁂
hida Bhagavaṃ jāte ti Luṃmini-gāme ubalike kaṭe
𑀅𑀞𑀪𑀸𑀕𑀺𑀬𑁂 𑀘
aṭha-bhāgiye ca

— Adapted from transliteration by E. Hultzsch,

Inscription
(Prakrit in the Brahmi script)

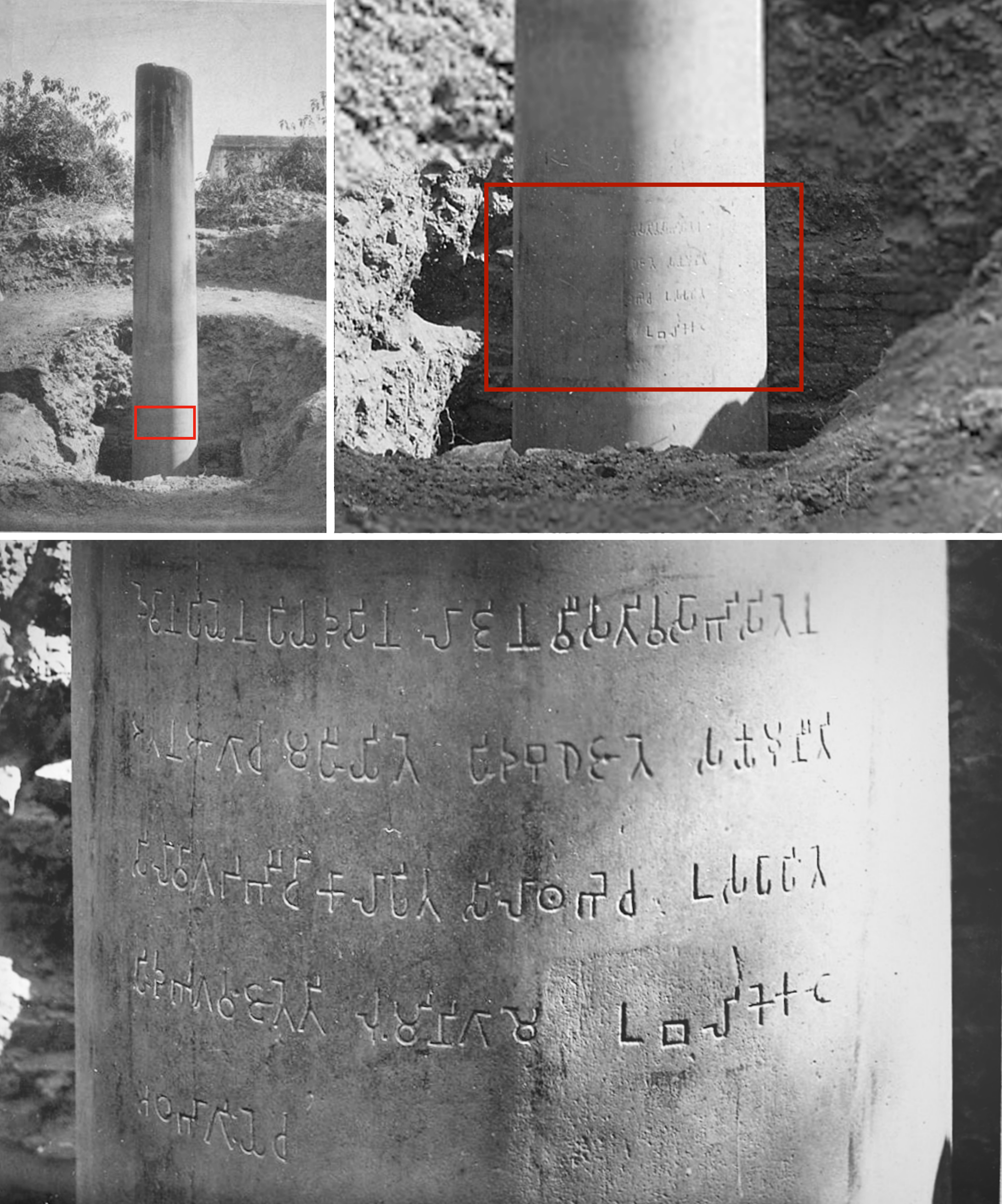
Lumbini Rummindei pillar at time of discovery in 1896, with location of the inscription, which was hidden about 1 meter under ground level.

== Aftermath ==
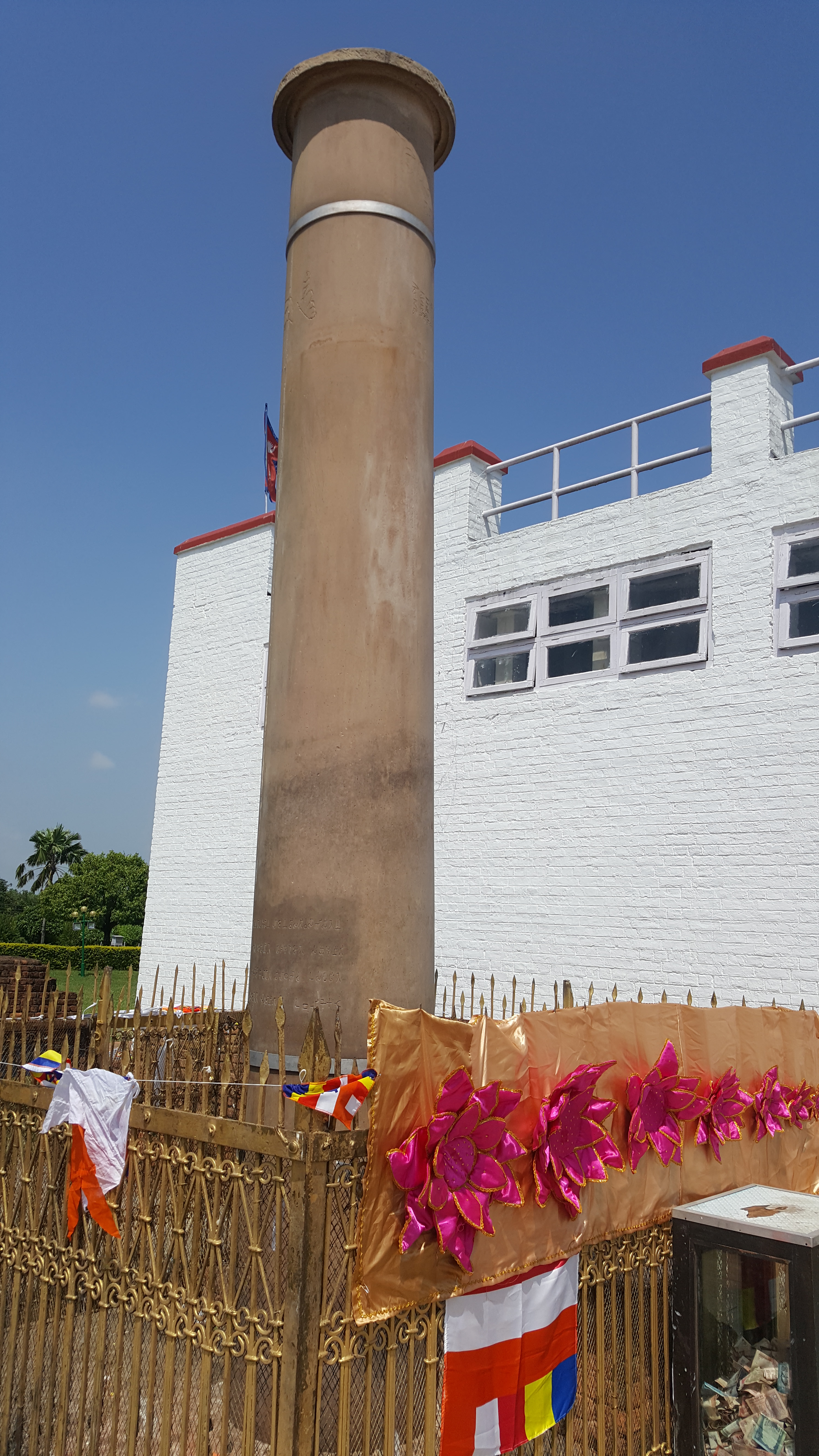
The pillar today, in the same location where it was found, with the inscription now at eye level following extensive earthworks. The top is a protection against the elements.

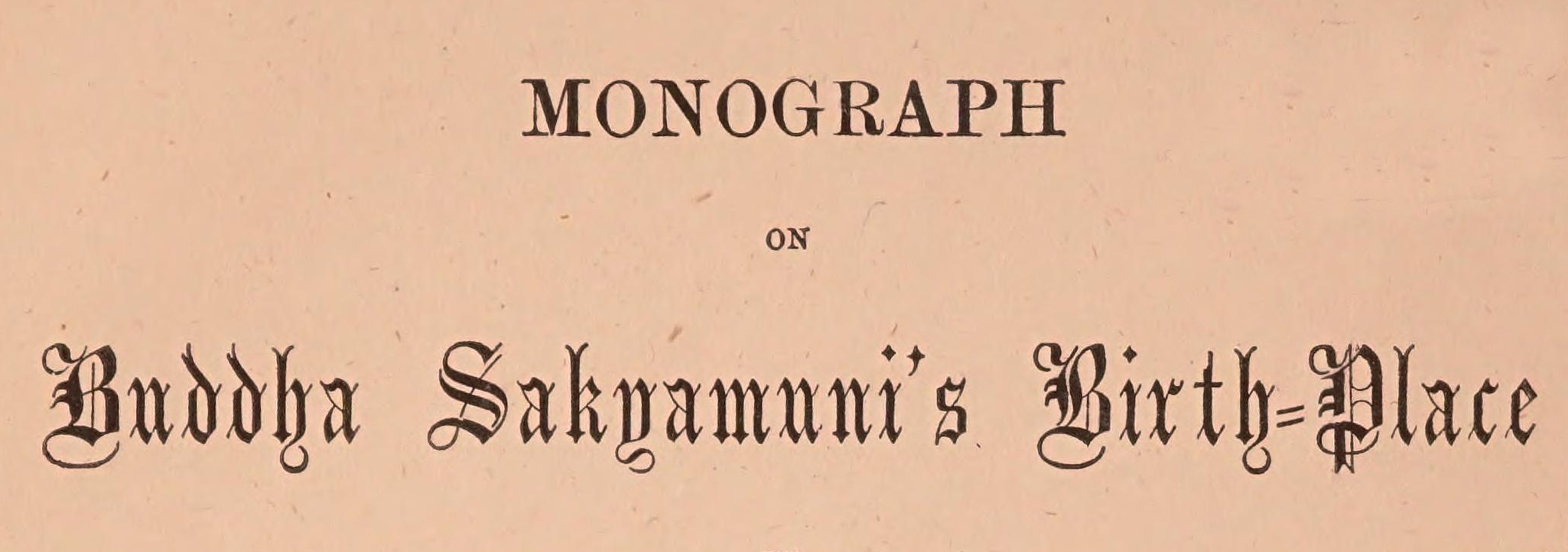
Alois Anton Führer own report on the discovery, entitled Monograph on Buddha Sakyamuni's birthplace, 1897

Following the discovery of the pillar, Führer relied on the accounts of ancient Chinese pilgrims to search for Kapilavastu, which he thought had to be in Tilaurakot. Unable to find anything significant, he started excavating some structures at Sagarwa, which he said were stupas of the Shakyas, and was in the process of faking pre-Mauryan inscriptions on bricks, when he was caught in the act by Vincent Arthur Smith.

Soon after, Alois Anton Führer was exposed as "a forger and dealer in fake antiquities", and had to resign from his position in 1898. Führer's early archaeological successes had apparently encouraged him to inflate his later discoveries to the point of creating forgeries. Vincent Arthur Smith further revealed in 1901 the blunt truth about Führer's Nepalese discoveries, saying of Führer's description of the archaeological remains at Nigali Sagar that "every word of it is false", and characterizing several of Führer's epigraphic discoveries in the area, including the inscriptions at the alleged Shakya stupas at Sagarwa, as "impudent forgeries". It was finally understood in 1901 that Führer had copied almost word-for-word this description from a report by Alexander Cunningham about the stupas in Sanchi. However Smith never challenged the authenticity of the Lumbini pillar inscription and the Nigali Sagar inscription, and accepted the identifications as authentic.

Führer had written in 1897 a monograph on his discoveries in Nigali Sagar and Lumbini, Monograph on Buddha Sakyamuni's birth-place in the Nepalese tarai which was withdrawn from circulation.

=== Forged Brahmi inscriptions by Führer ===
In 1912, the German Indologist Heinrich Lüders identified in the Lucknow Provincial Museum (of which Führer had been curator) several forged inscriptions in Brahmi on artifacts belonging to Führer's 1889–1891 excavations at Mathura and the Ramnagar site of Ahichchhatra, forgeries which he attributed to Führer himself. Some of the forged inscriptions were direct copies of inscriptions on other objects, previously published in Epigraphia Indica. In particular Lüders was able to show that supposed Jain inscriptions were fakes compiled from earlier real inscriptions found in Mathura. Of the Mathura inscriptions discovered by Führer, Lüders summarized in 1912 that "As all statements about epigraphical finds that admit of verification have proved to be false, it is very likely that no inscriptions at all have turned up". However, Lüders never questioned the genuineness of the Piprahwa inscription.

Harry Falk—a leading scholar of Ashoka's inscriptions—has stated that the authenticity of Ashoka's Lumbini inscription is "beyond dispute," and that "features of truly Aśokan script, some of them extinct at the middle of the second century BC" could not realistically have been forged by Führer who was "extremely clumsy", "ill-educated in Prakrit phonology and morphology", and "ignorant to the same degree of Brāhmī palaeography," therefore "disqualifying Führer as the author of a perfect fake."

== Issues of authenticity ==
Although generally accepted as genuine, this inscription does raise a few issues in terms of authenticity:

- The Lumbini inscription is in the third person, written by someone reporting a past visit of Devanampriya Priyadarsi, and is not written in Devanampriya Priyadarsi's own name contrary to all other known Edicts of Ashoka. So, by its own internal evidence, it may have been written at any time in history after the ruler's visit. In effect, ancient Brahmi was still understood until the beginning of 4th century CE before being rediscovered in the 19th century.
- The qualifier used for the Buddha in the inscription is Sakyamuni (𑀲𑀓𑁆𑀬𑀫𑀼𑀦𑀺), which is a partly Sanskritized form of the Prakrit Sakamuni (𑀲𑀓𑀫𑀼𑀦𑀺 "Sage of the Sakas), although the fully Sanskritized form would be Śakyamuni (𑀰𑀓𑁆𑀬𑀫𑀼𑀦𑀺, pronounced "Shakyamuni"). The problem is that the rest of the inscription is entirely in Prakrit, and Sanskrit inscriptions are not otherwise attested before the 1st century BCE-1st century CE. "Sakyamuni" only appears in the Lumbini inscription, the other known forms being "Sakiya" in the Piprahwa inscription, "Sakka" in the Pali literature, "Sakka" and "Śakka" in Prakrit literature, "Saka" (Bharhut) and "Śaka" in the epigraphic record.
- The Buddha is never mentioned in the Major Pillar Edicts nor in the Major Rock Edicts, and only appears once in the Bairat Temple inscription.
- The inscription was discovered by Nepalese General Kadga Shameshar, the famous Anton Führer initially was not there and arrived shortly after the discovery. The engraving is in extremely good condition and seems fresh, arguably because the portion of the pillar which contains the inscription remained underground for so long. Still, when Rhys Davids made a copy of the inscription in 1900, he noted that it was "almost as if freshly cut". Following re-examination fifty years later, academics commented: "The pillar bears an inscription of Asoka, very well preserved. The lines are straight and letters very tastefully written. It appears as if the inscription has been very recently incised."

These issues were popularized in 2008 by British writer Charles Allen in The Buddha and Dr. Führer: an archaeological scandal, who concluded "there is no doubt at all that it was Asoka the Great who erected the Asokan rock and pillar edicts".

Harry Falk—a leading scholar of Ashoka's inscriptions—has stated that the authenticity of Ashoka's Lumbini inscription is "beyond dispute," and that "features of truly Aśokan script, some of them extinct at the middle of the second century BC" could not realistically have been forged by Führer who was "extremely clumsy", "ill-educated in Prakrit phonology and morphology", and "ignorant to the same degree of Brāhmī palaeography," therefore "disqualifying Führer as the author of a perfect fake."

== Gallery ==
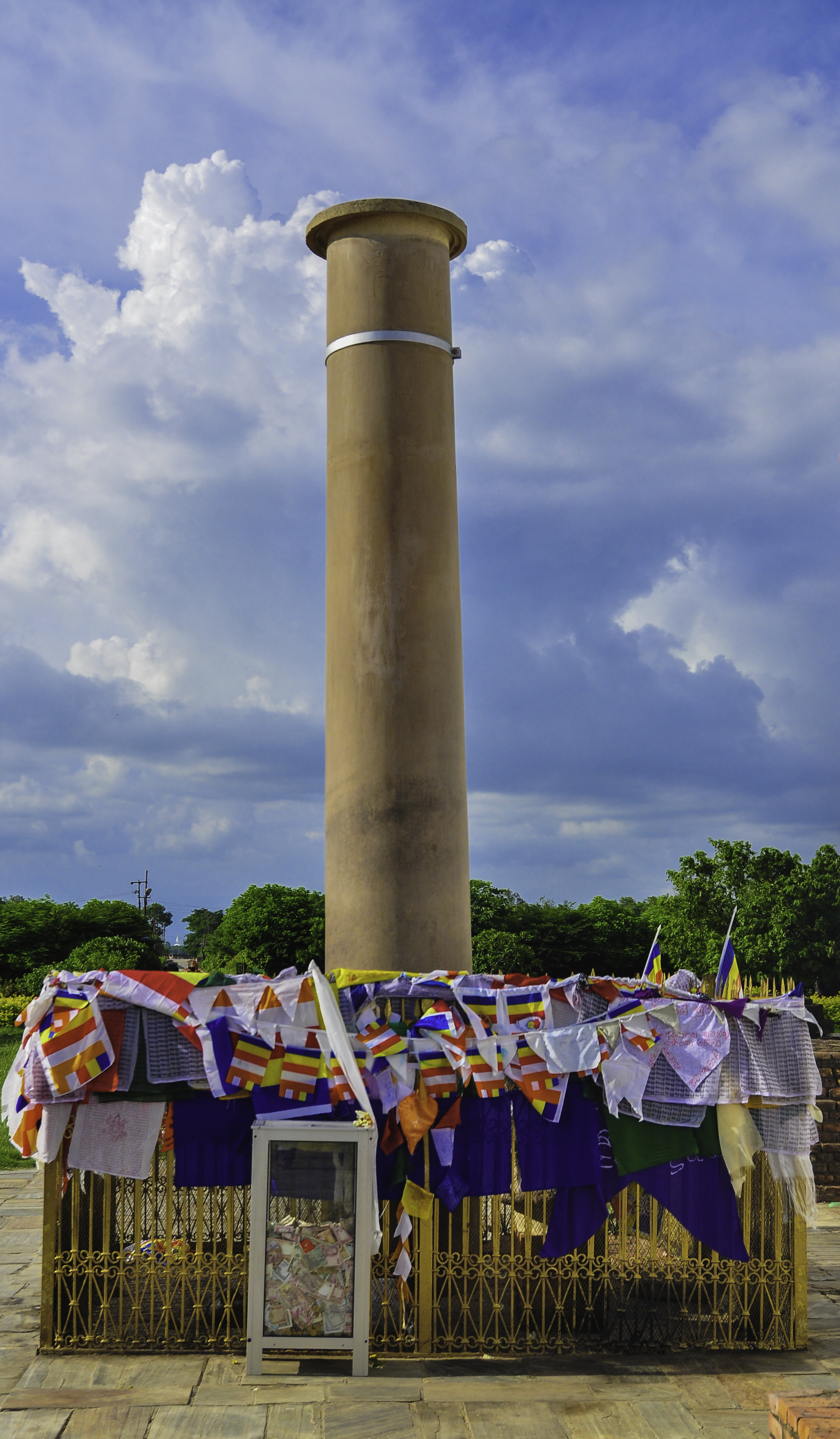
The pillar of Ashoka.

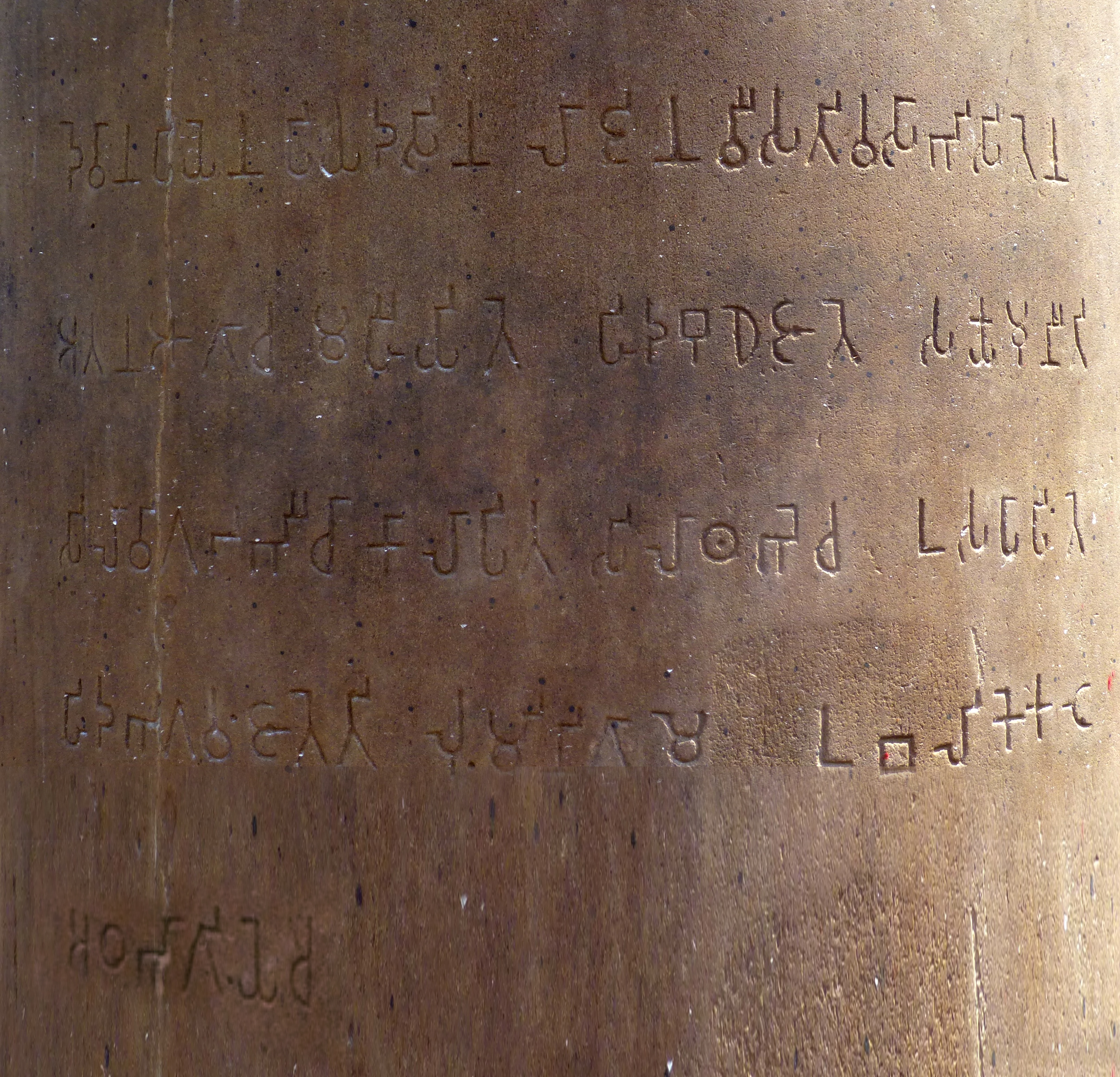
The Ashoka inscription on the pillar today.

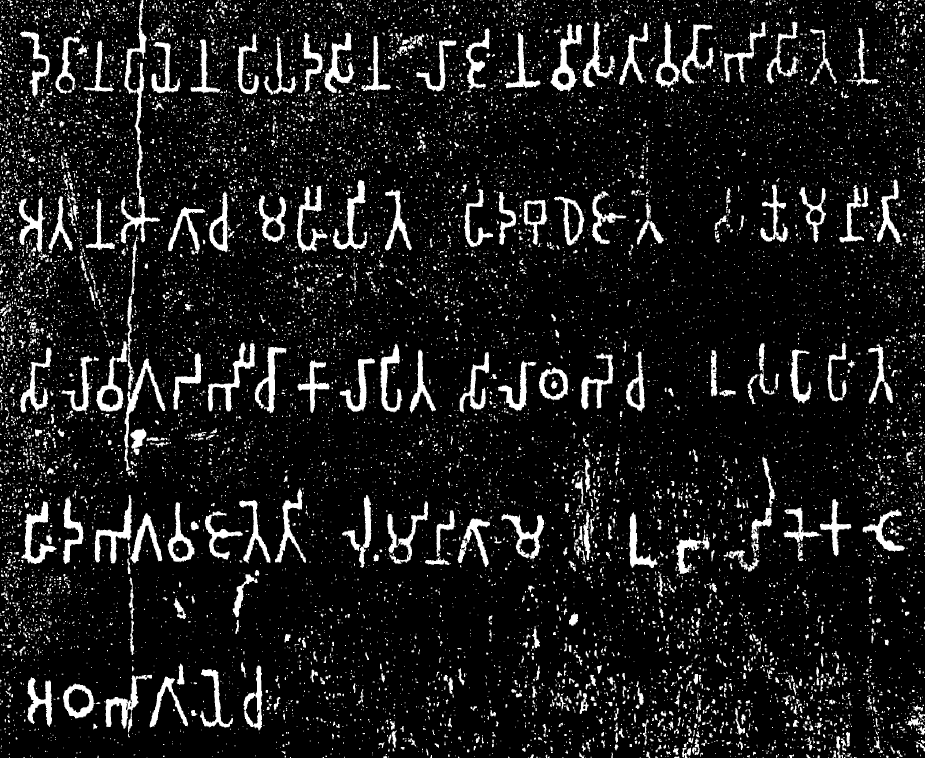
Rubbing of the inscription.

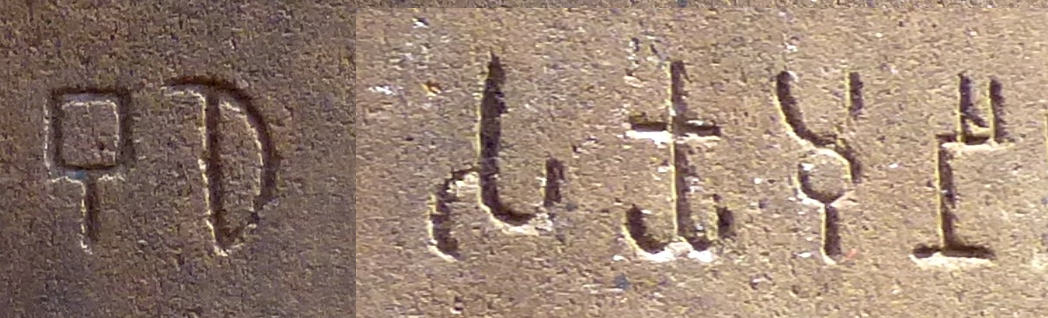
The words Bu-dhe (𑀩𑀼𑀥𑁂, the Buddha) and Sa-kya-mu-nī ( 𑀲𑀓𑁆𑀬𑀫𑀼𑀦𑀻, "Sage of the Shakyas") in Brahmi script.

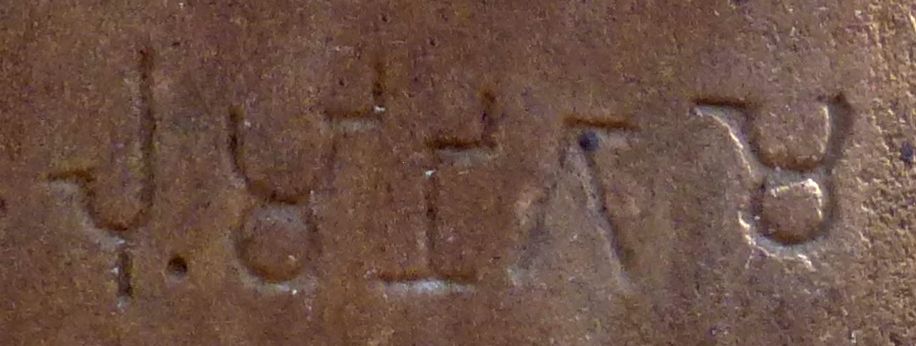
Luṃmini Gāme (𑀮𑀼𑀁𑀫𑀺𑀦𑀺𑀕𑀸𑀫𑁂, "City of Lumbini") inscription in the Rummindei Edict of Ashoka.

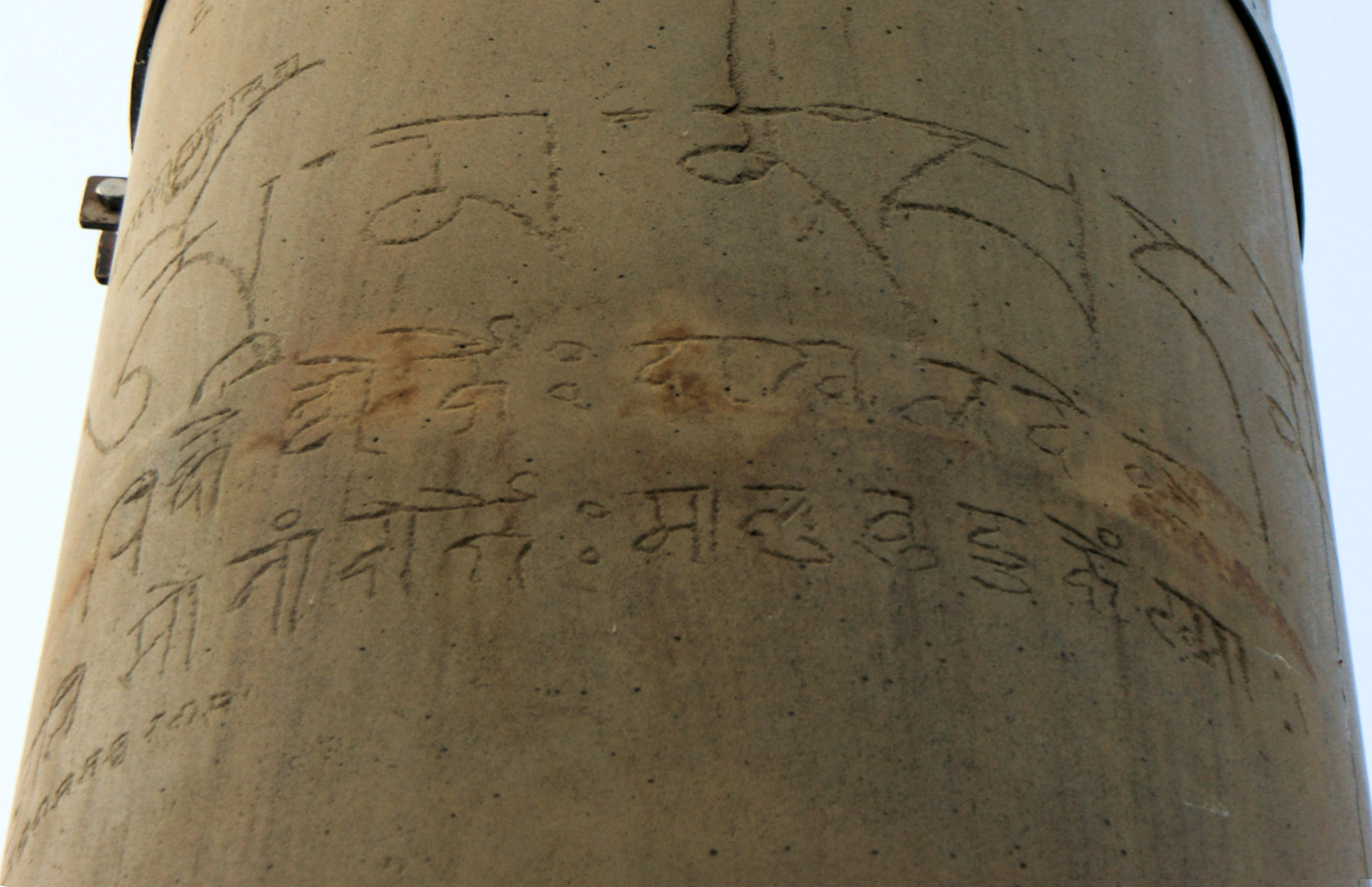
Lumbini pillar medieval inscription of king Ripumalla, 13-14th century CE.

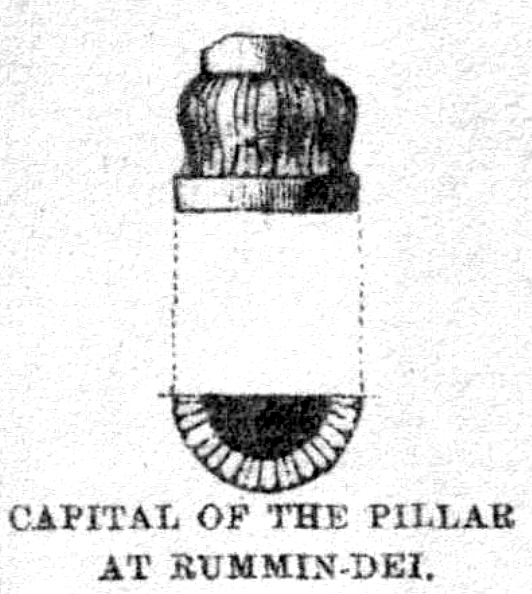
Drawing of the pillar capital originally discovered next to the Lumbini pillar.

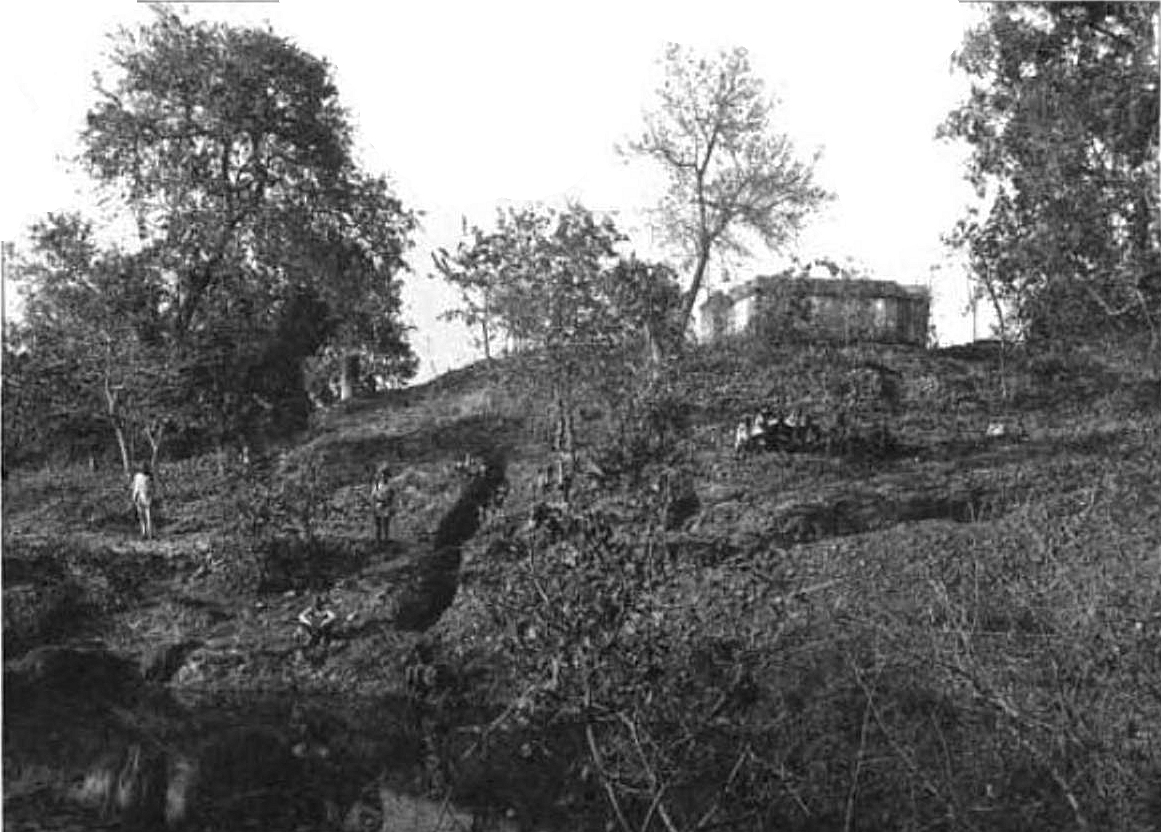
View of the ruins and the Lumbini pillar from the South

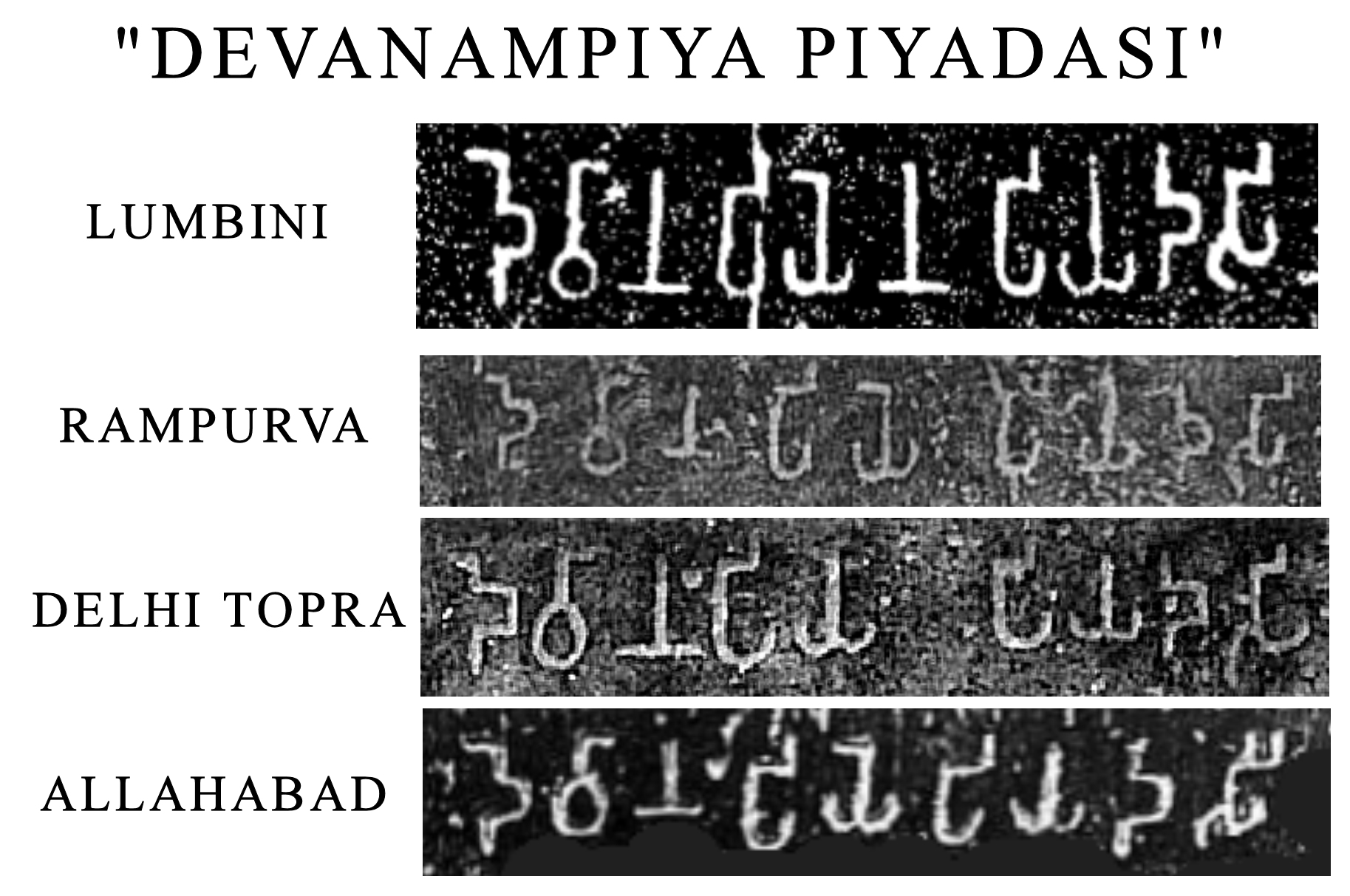
Various "Devanampiya Piyadasi" inscriptions on the Pillars of Ashoka.
