= Gotihawa =

Gotihawa गोटिहवा
- Village development committee
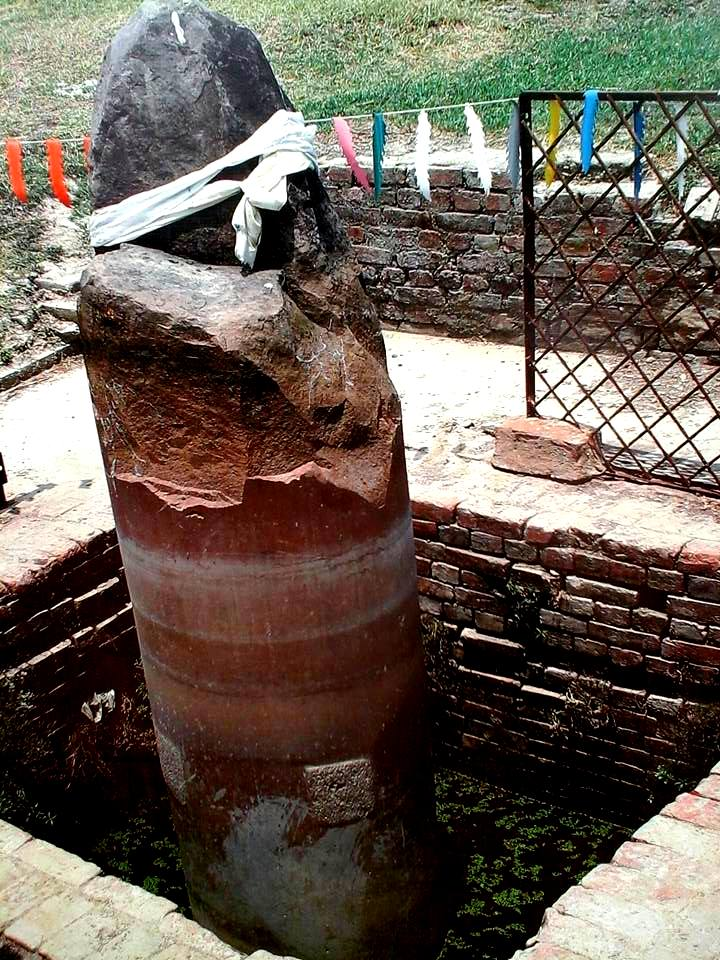
- The Gotihawa Pillar of Ashoka.

- Location in Nepal Gotihawa (South Asia)
- Coordinates: 27.51°N 83.03°E
- Country: Nepal
- Zone: Lumbini Zone
- District: Kapilvastu District
- Elevation: 103 m (338 ft)

Population (1991)
  - Total: 3,335
- Time zone: UTC+5:45 (Nepal Time)

Protected Ancient Monument
- Name: Stone Column of Gotihawa
- Law: Ancient Monuments Preservation Act, 2013 (1956)
- ID: NP-KP-04

Gotihawa (formerly called Gutivā in Western sources) is a village development committee located about 4 kilometres (2.5 mi) southeast of Kapilavastu, in Kapilvastu District, in the Lumbini Zone of southern Nepal. At the time of the 1991 Nepal census it had a population of 3,335 people living in 567 individual households.

== History ==
Modern-day Gotihawa was known as Khemavati in ancient times. According to Theravāda Buddhist tradition, Kakusandha Buddha was born in Khemavati. Kakusandha Buddha is one of the ancient Buddhas whose biography is chronicled in chapter 22 of the Buddhavamsa, one of the books of the Pāli Canon.

The base of a Pillar of Ashoka has been discovered at Gotihawa, and it has been suggested that it is the original base of the Nigali Sagar pillar fragments, found a few miles away, which contain an inscription of Ashoka (3rd century BCE).

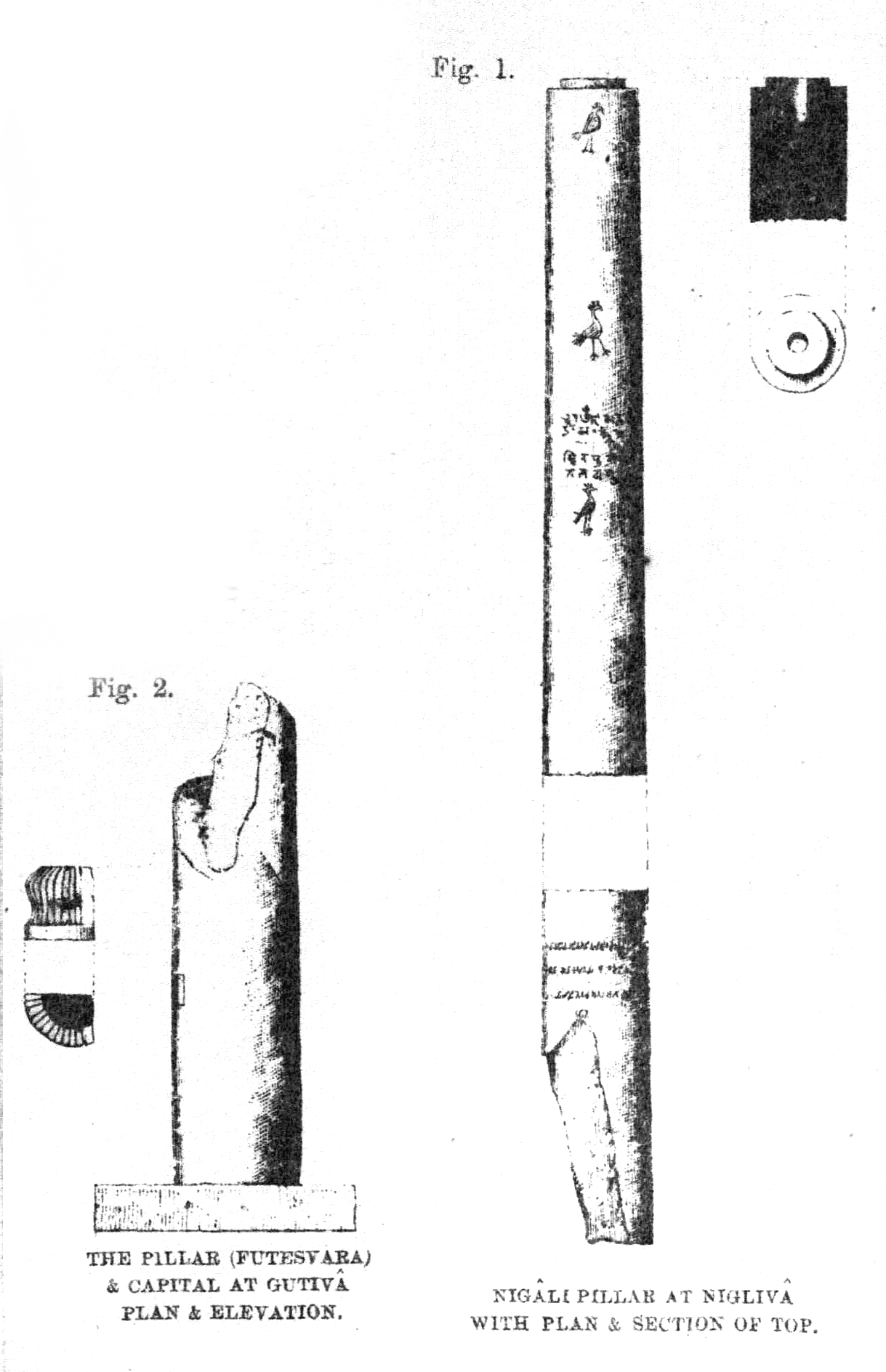
Fragments of Gotihawa (left) and Nigali Sagar (right).
