= Nigali Sagar =

Archaeological site in Nepal

Nigali Sagar pillar of Ashoka at Nepal
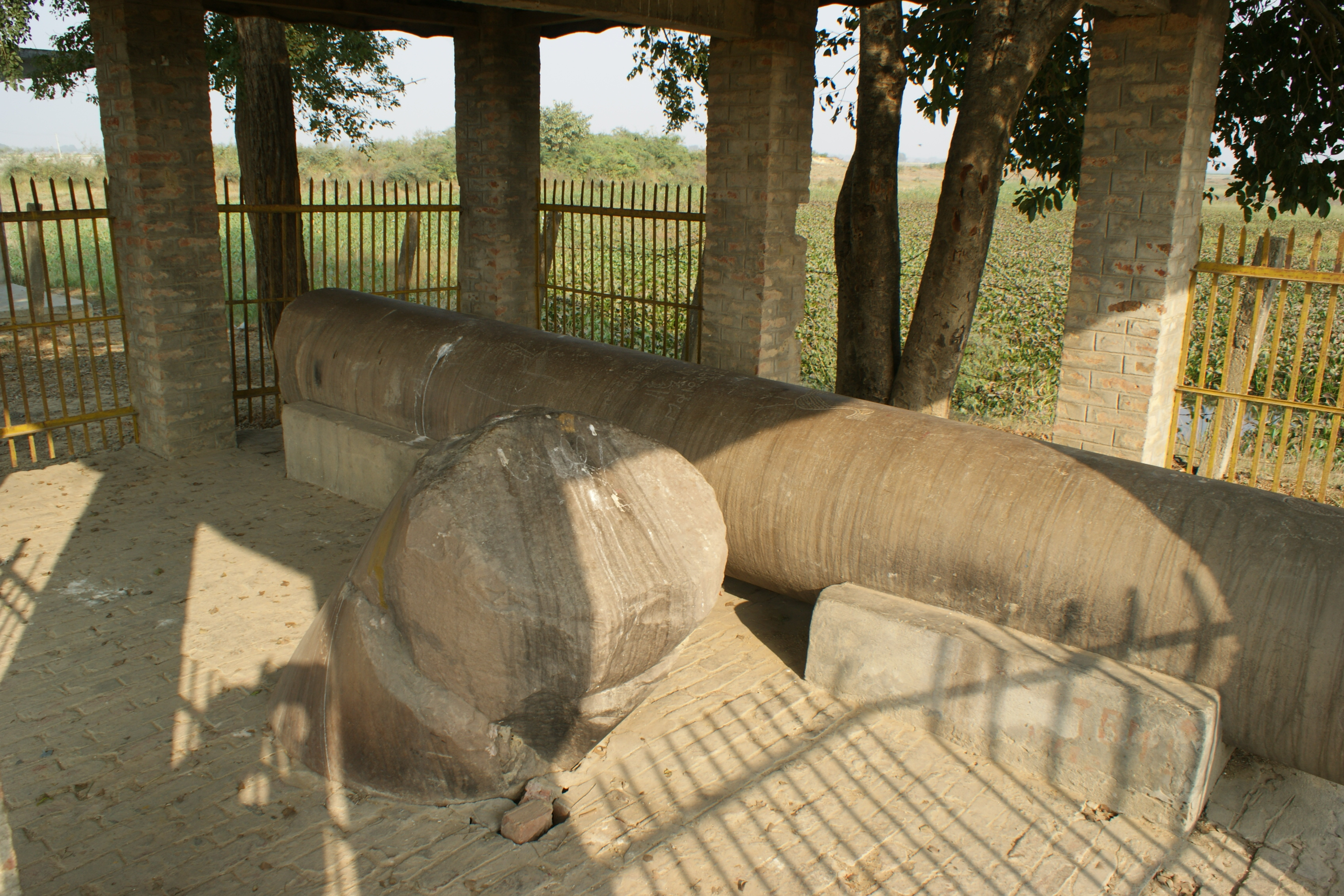
- The Nigali Sagar pillar, one of the pillars of Ashoka.
- Material: Polished sandstone
- Size: Height: Width:
- Period/culture: 3rd century BCE
- Discovered: 27°35′41.7″N 83°05′44.9″E
- Place: Nigalihawa, Nepal.
- Present location: Nigalihawa, Nepal.

Location

Protected Ancient Monument
- Law: Ancient Monuments Preservation Act, 2013 (1956)
- ID: NP-KP-05

Nigali Sagar (also called Nigliva, Nigali Sagar pillar, Nighihawa pillar, Nigliva pillar, or Araurakot pillar) is an archaeological site in Nepal containing the remains of a pillar of Ashoka. The site is located in Nigalihawa, about 20 kilometers northwest of Lumbini and 7 kilometers northeast of Taulihawa. Another famous inscription discovered nearby in a similar context is the Lumbini pillar inscription.

== Discovery ==
The pillar was discovered in 1893 by a Nepalese officer on a hunting expedition. The pillar and its inscriptions (there are several inscriptions on it, from Brahmi to Medieval) were researched in March 1895 by Alois Anton Führer. Führer published his discovery in the Progress Report of the Archaeological Survey Circle, North-West Province, for the year ending on June 30, 1895.

Nigali Sagar pillar with inscription
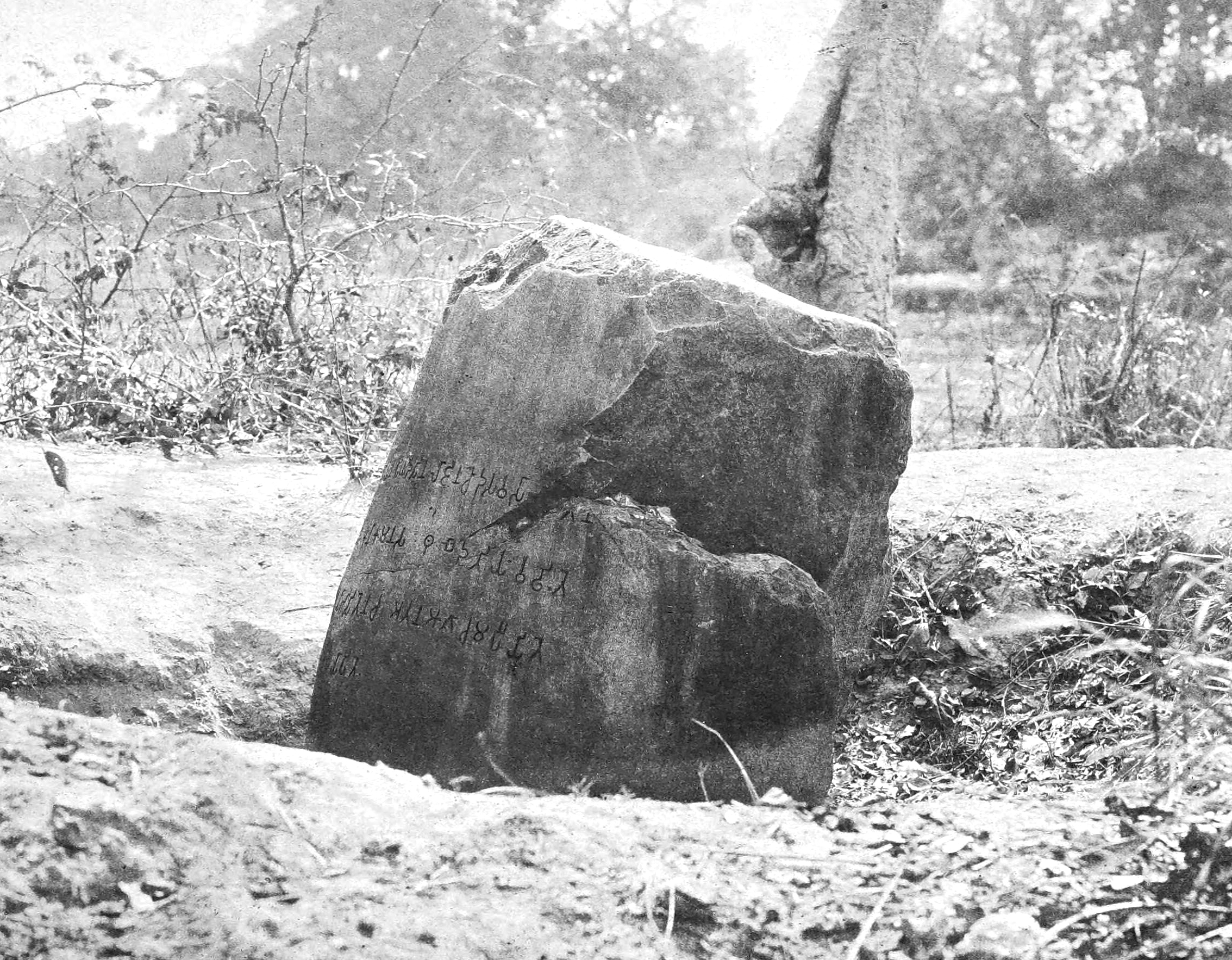
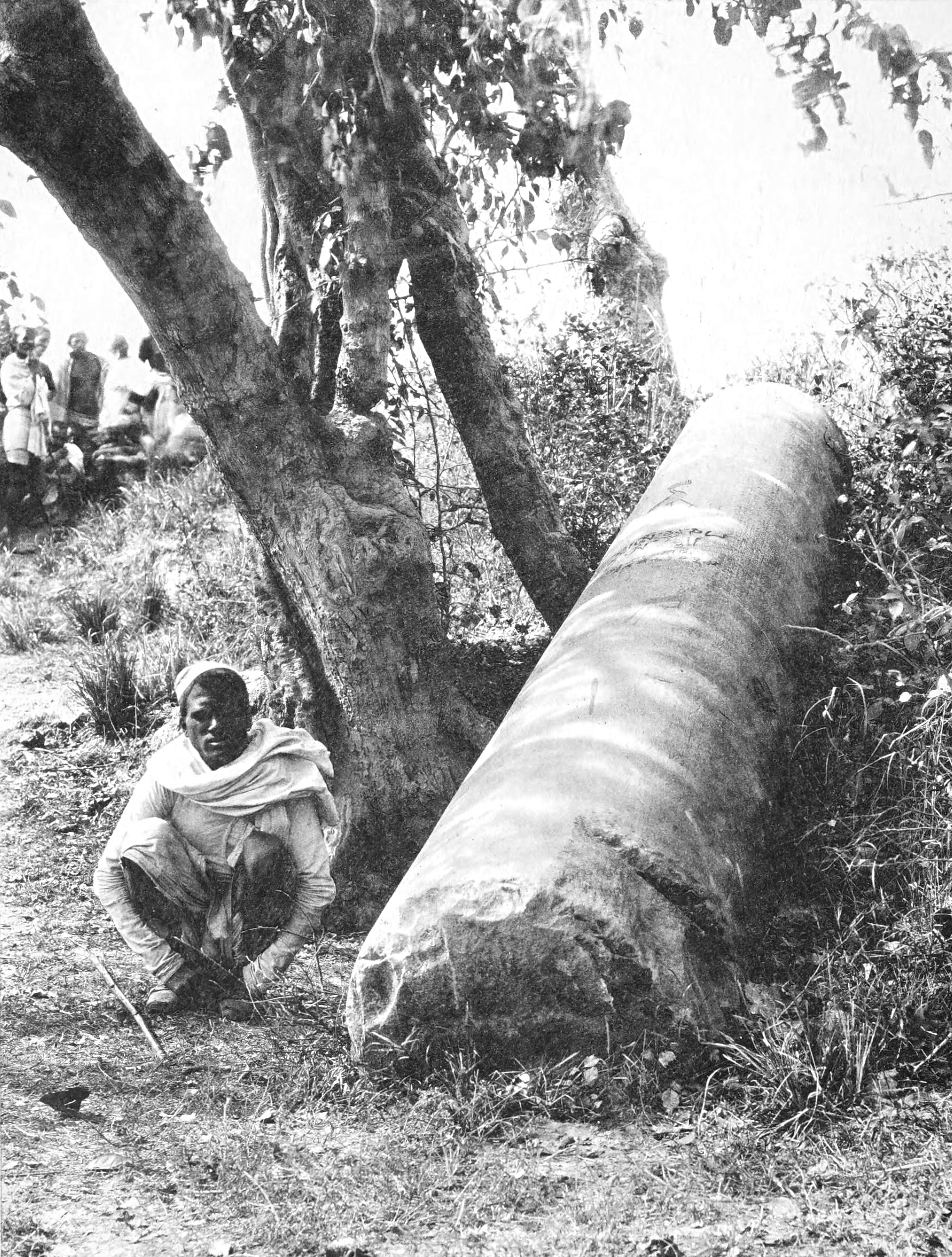
Nigali Sagar pillar stump with exposed inscription, and separated top portion.

The pillar was not erected in-situ, as no foundation has been discovered under it. It is thought that it was moved about 8 to 13 miles, from an uncertain location (possibly from Taulihawa or Gotihawa).

Besides his description of the pillar, Führer made a detailed description of the remains of a monumental "Konagamana stupa" near the Nigali Sagar pillar, which was later discovered to be an imaginative construct. Führer wrote that "On all sides around this interesting monument are ruined monasteries, fallen columns, and broken sculptures", when actually nothing can be found around the pillar. In the following years, inspections of the site showed that there were no such archaeological remains, and that, in respect to Fuhrer's description "every word of it is false". It was finally understood in 1901 that Führer had copied almost word-for-word this description from a report by Alexander Cunningham about the stupas in Sanchi.

=== Authenticity ===
The fact that the inscription was discovered by Führer, who is also known to have forged Brahmi inscriptions on ancient stone artefacts, was suggested by some scholars to cast a doubt on the authenticity of this inscription. However, historian Vincent Arthur Smith—who had exposed Führer's forgeries—never challenged the authenticity of the Lumbini pillar inscription and the Nigali Sagar inscription, only noting that the broken section of the Nigali Sagar had been moved at an unknown time from its original location, and did not have other ancient remains around it as Führer had claimed.

Harry Falk—a leading scholar of Ashoka's inscriptions—has stated that the authenticity of Ashoka's Lumbini inscription is "beyond dispute," and that "features of truly Aśokan script, some of them extinct at the middle of the second century BC" could not realistically have been forged by Führer who was "extremely clumsy", "ill-educated in Prakrit phonology and morphology", and "ignorant to the same degree of Brāhmī palaeography," therefore "disqualifying Führer as the author of a perfect fake."

Charles Allen has argued that the Nigali Sagar pillar is an authentic inscription of Ashoka that was originally located in Taulihawa a few kilometres away, where a 19th century Hindu temple was built around possibly the base of the pillar, worshipped as a Shiva linga. "After the upper part of the pillar had been pulled down or broken off," proposes Allen, this inscribed section was moved to the present location Nigali Sagar, "perhaps so that the upper section could be used as a roller for crushing sugar cane".

== Kanakamuni Buddha ==
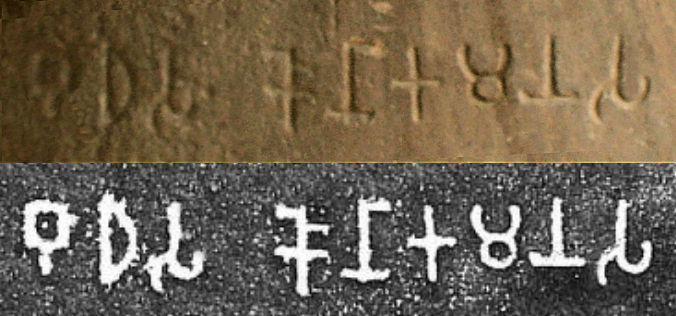
"Budha-sa Konākamana-sa" (𑀩𑀼𑀥𑀲 𑀓𑁄𑀦𑀸𑀓𑀫𑀦𑀲, "Of the Kanakamuni Buddha") inscription in the Brahmi Script, at Nigali Sagar, 250 BCE

The inscription says that in this place the Kanakamuni Buddha, one of the Buddhas of the past, was born. The Ashoka inscription engraved on the pillar in Brahmi script and Pali language attests the fact that Emperor Asoka enlarged the Kanakamuni Buddha's stupa, worshiped it and erected a stone pillar for Kanakamuni Buddha on the occasion of the twentieth year of his coronation.

== The Nigali Sagar Edict ==
The inscription, made when Emperor Asoka visited the site in 249 BCE and erected the pillar, reads:

Nigali Sagar Edict
Translation
(English)

Beloved of the Gods Priyadarsin in the 14th year of his reign enlarged for the second time the stupa of the Buddha Kanakamuni and in the 20th year of his reign, having come in person, paid reverence and set up a stone pillar.

Transliteration
(original Brahmi script)

𑀤𑁂𑀯𑀸𑀦𑀁𑀧𑀺𑀬𑁂𑀦 𑀧𑀺𑀬𑀤𑀲𑀺𑀦 𑀮𑀸𑀚𑀺𑀦 𑀘𑁄𑀤𑀲𑀯𑀲𑀸 𑀪𑀺𑀲𑀺𑀢𑁂𑀦
Devānam piyena piyadasina lajina chodasavasā [bhisite]na
𑀩𑀼𑀥𑀲 𑀓𑁄𑀦𑀸𑀓𑀫𑀦𑀲 𑀣𑀼𑀩𑁂𑀤𑀼𑀢𑀺𑀬𑀁 𑀯𑀠𑀺𑀢𑁂
Budhasa Konākamanasa thube-dutyam vaḍhite
𑀯𑀺𑀲𑀢𑀺𑀯 𑀲𑀸𑀪𑀺𑀲𑀺𑀢𑁂𑀦𑀘 𑀅𑀢𑀦 𑀅𑀕𑀸𑀘 𑀫𑀳𑀻𑀬𑀺𑀢𑁂
[Visativa] sābhisitena ca atana-agāca mahīyite
𑀲𑀺𑀮𑀣𑀩𑁂𑀘 𑀉𑀲𑀧𑀧𑀺𑀢𑁂
[silathabe ca usa] papite

Inscription
(Prakrit in the Brahmi script)

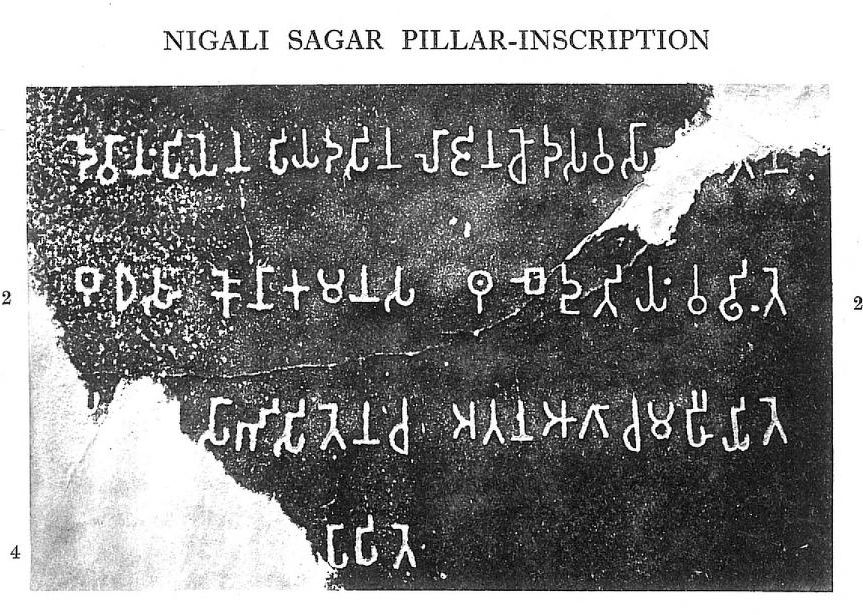
Rubbing of the inscription.

Because of this dedication by Ashoka, the Nigali Sagar pillar has the earliest known record ever of the word "stupa" (here the Pali word Thube).

There is also a second inscription, "Om mani padme hum" and "Sri Ripu Malla Chiram Jayatu 1234" made by King Ripu Malla in the year 1234 (Saka Era, corresponding to 1312 CE).

== Accounts of the pillar ==
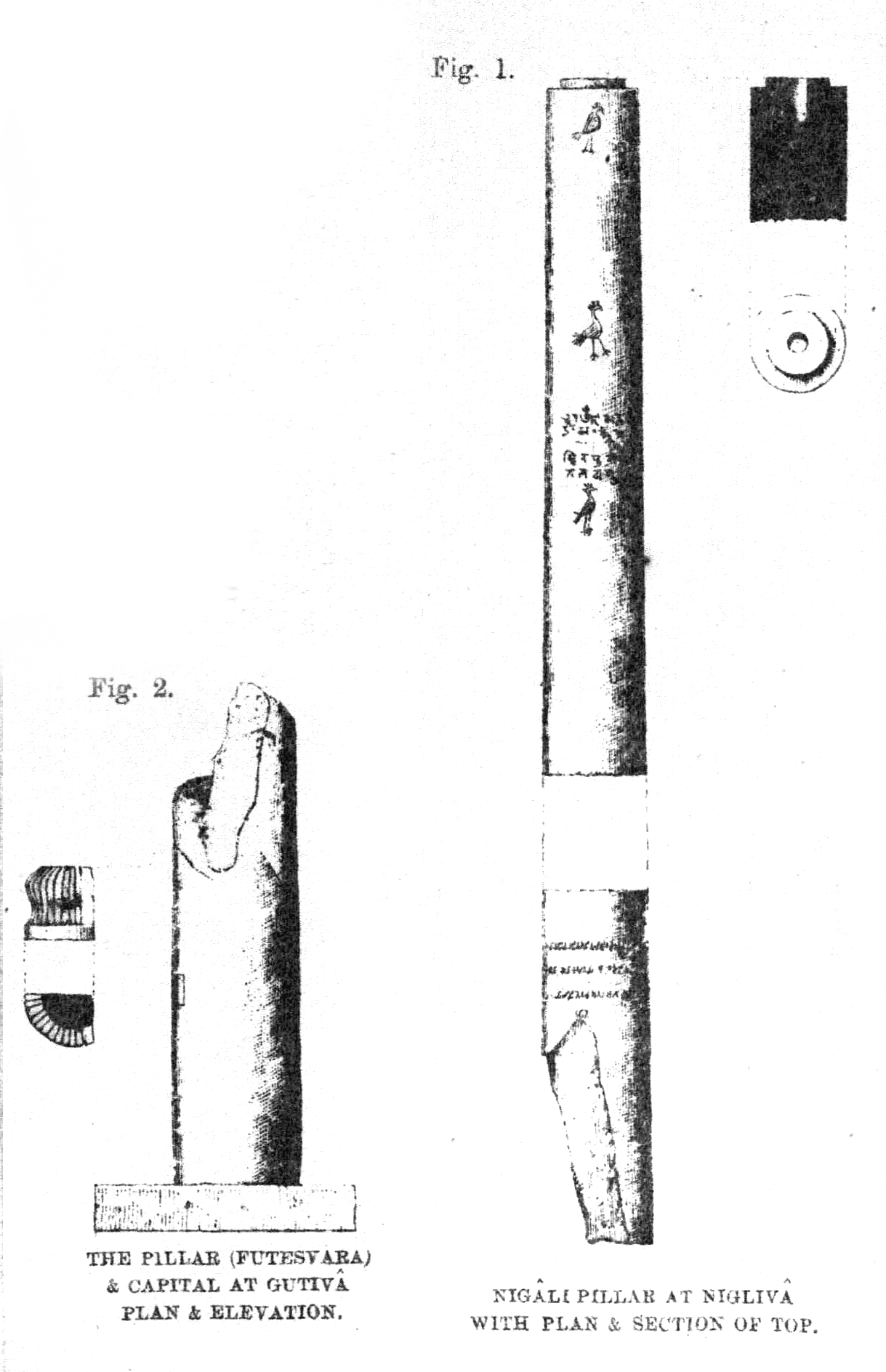
Fragments of Gotihawa and Nigali Sagar, possibly belonging to the same pillar.

The Chinese pilgrims Fa-Hien (337 CE – c. 422 CE) and Xuanzang (602–664 CE) describe the Kanakamuni Stupa and the Asoka Pillar in their travel accounts. Xuanzang speaks of a lion capital atop the pillar, now lost.

A base of a Pillar of Ashoka has been discovered at Gotihawa, a few miles from Nigali Sagar, and it has been suggested that it is the original base of the Nigalar Sagar pillar fragments.

== Gallery ==
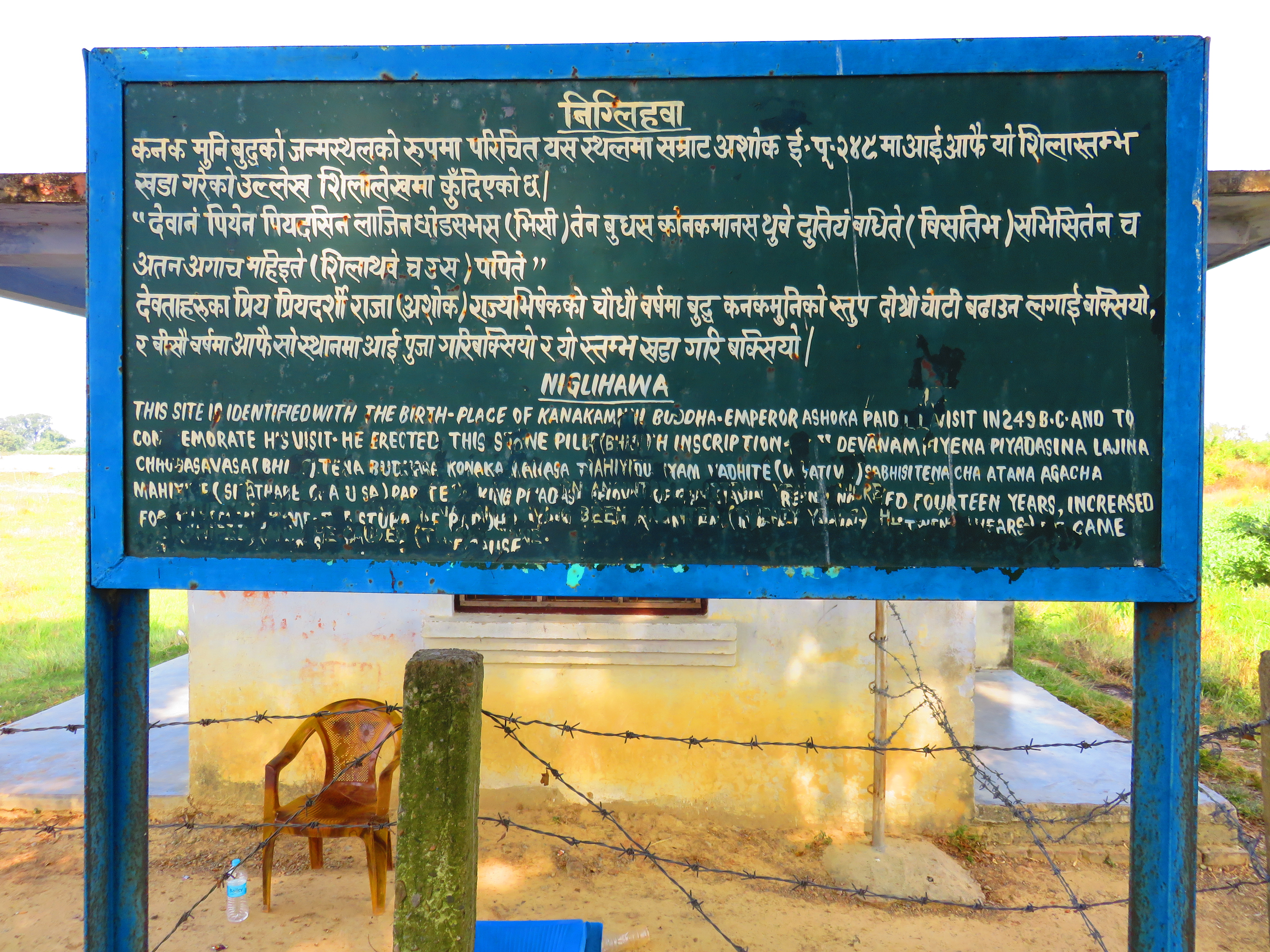
Birthplace of Koṇāgamana Buddha. Nigalihawa, Kapilvastu District, Nepal

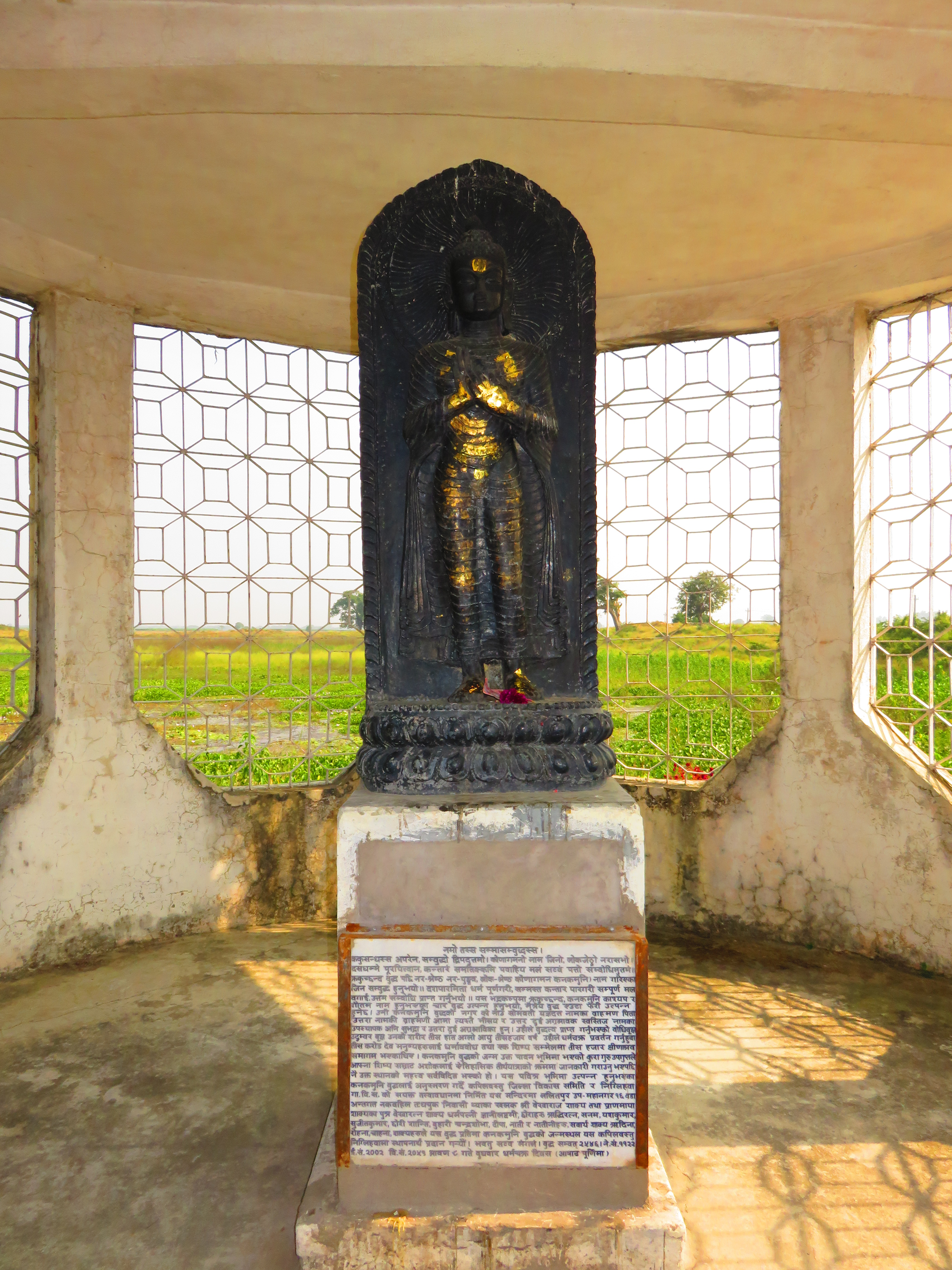
Statue commemorating the birthplace of Koṇāgamana Buddha. Nigalihawa, Kapilvastu District, Nepal

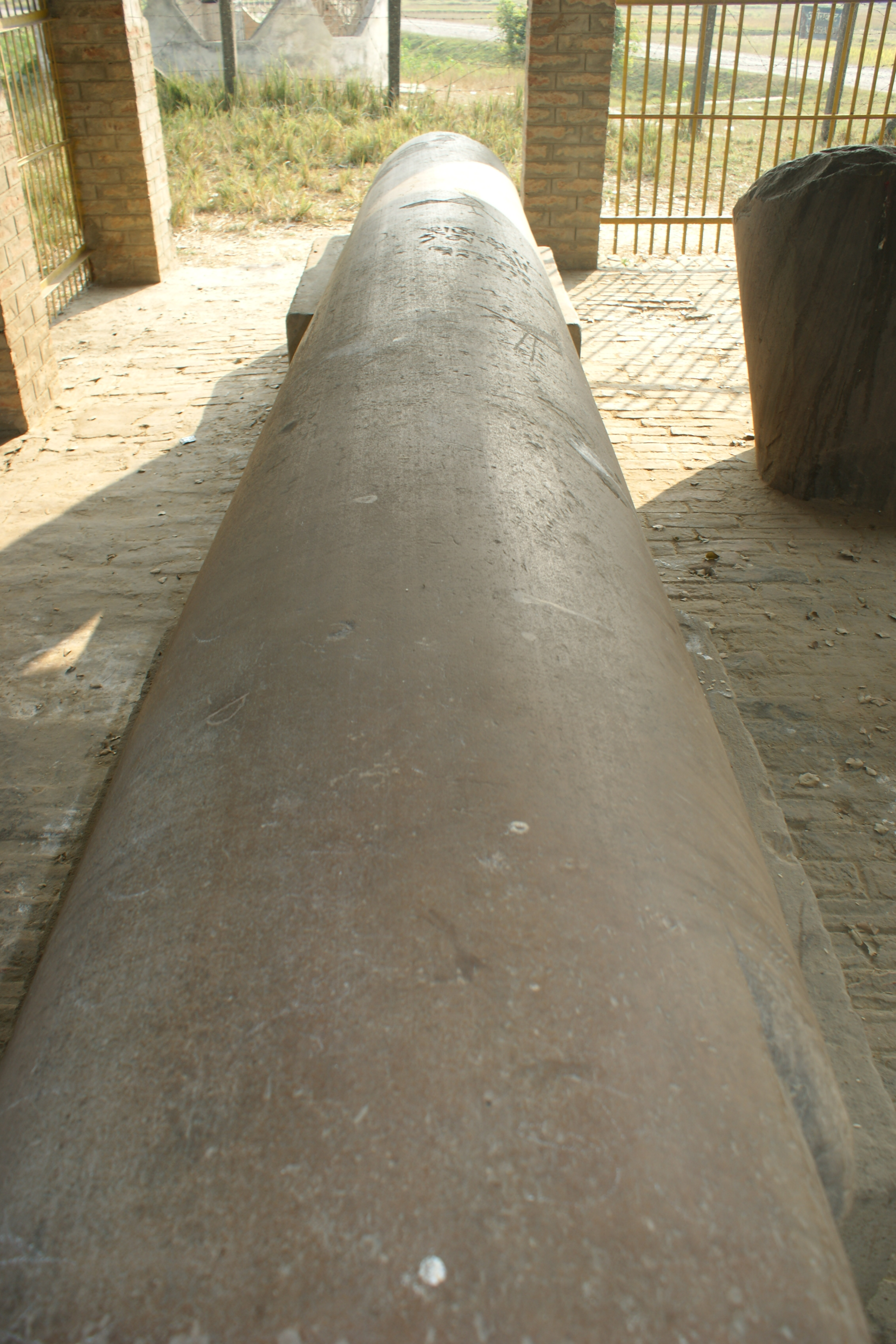
Full length of the pillar

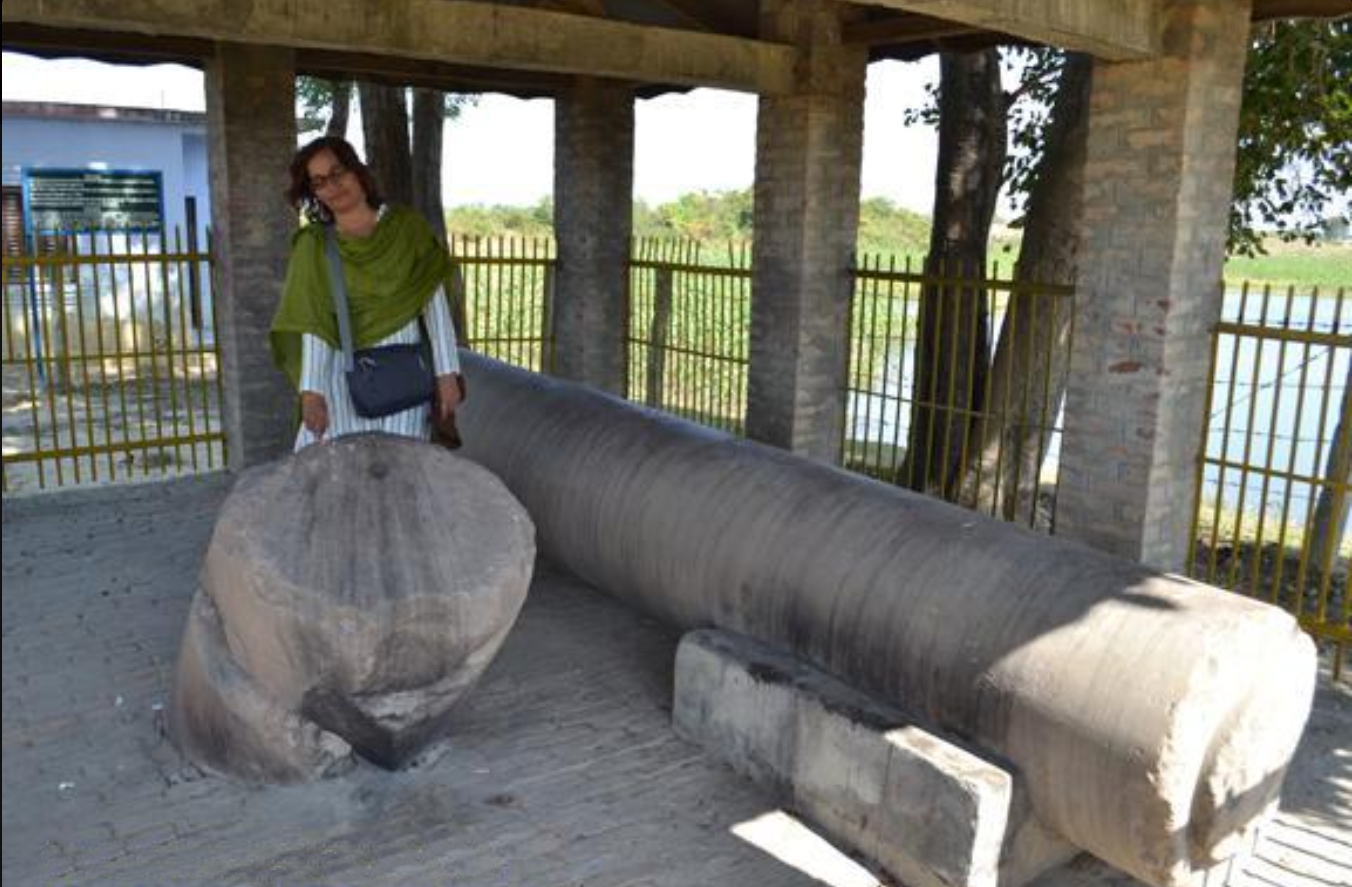
Another general view

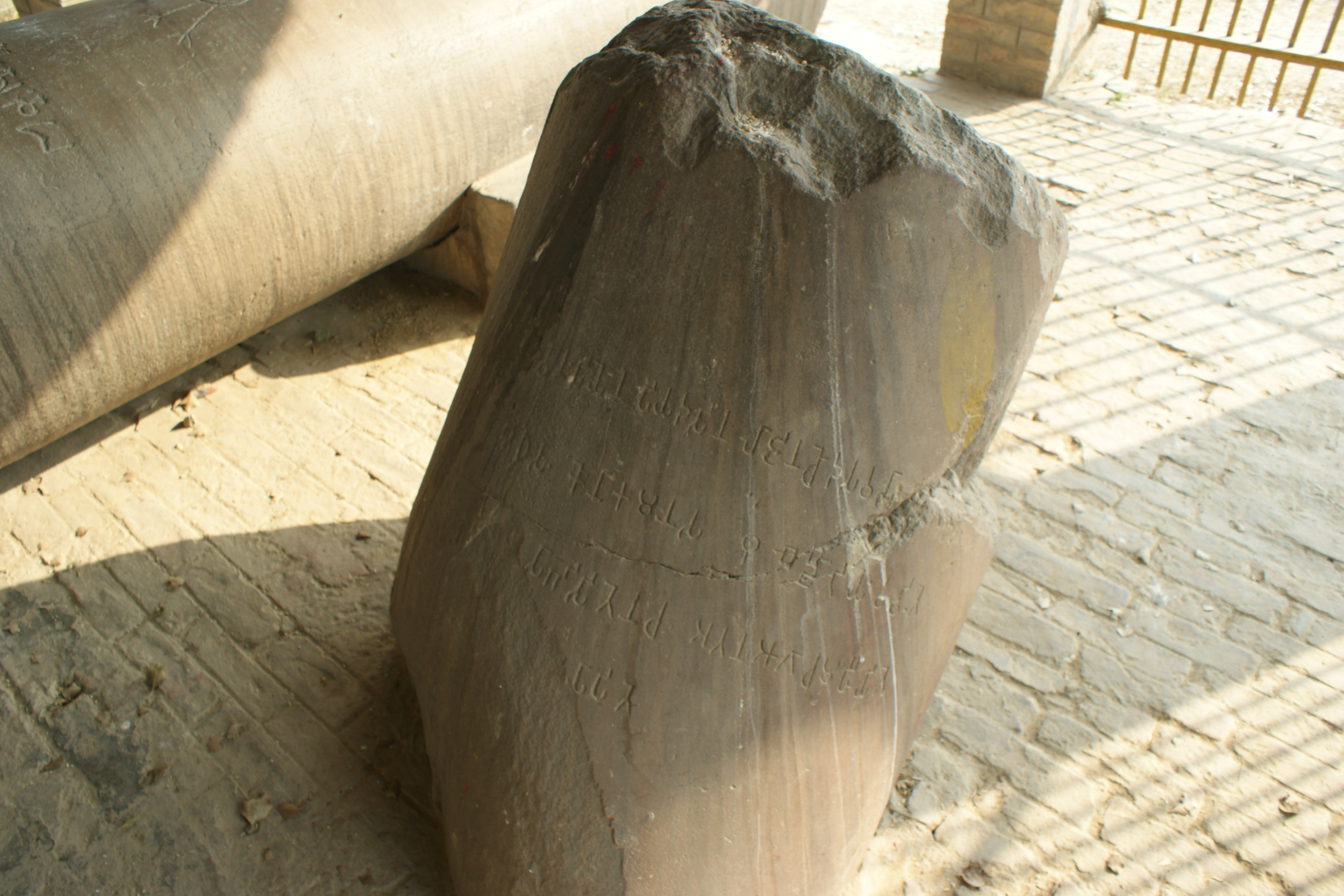
Pillar stump and inscription of Ashoka

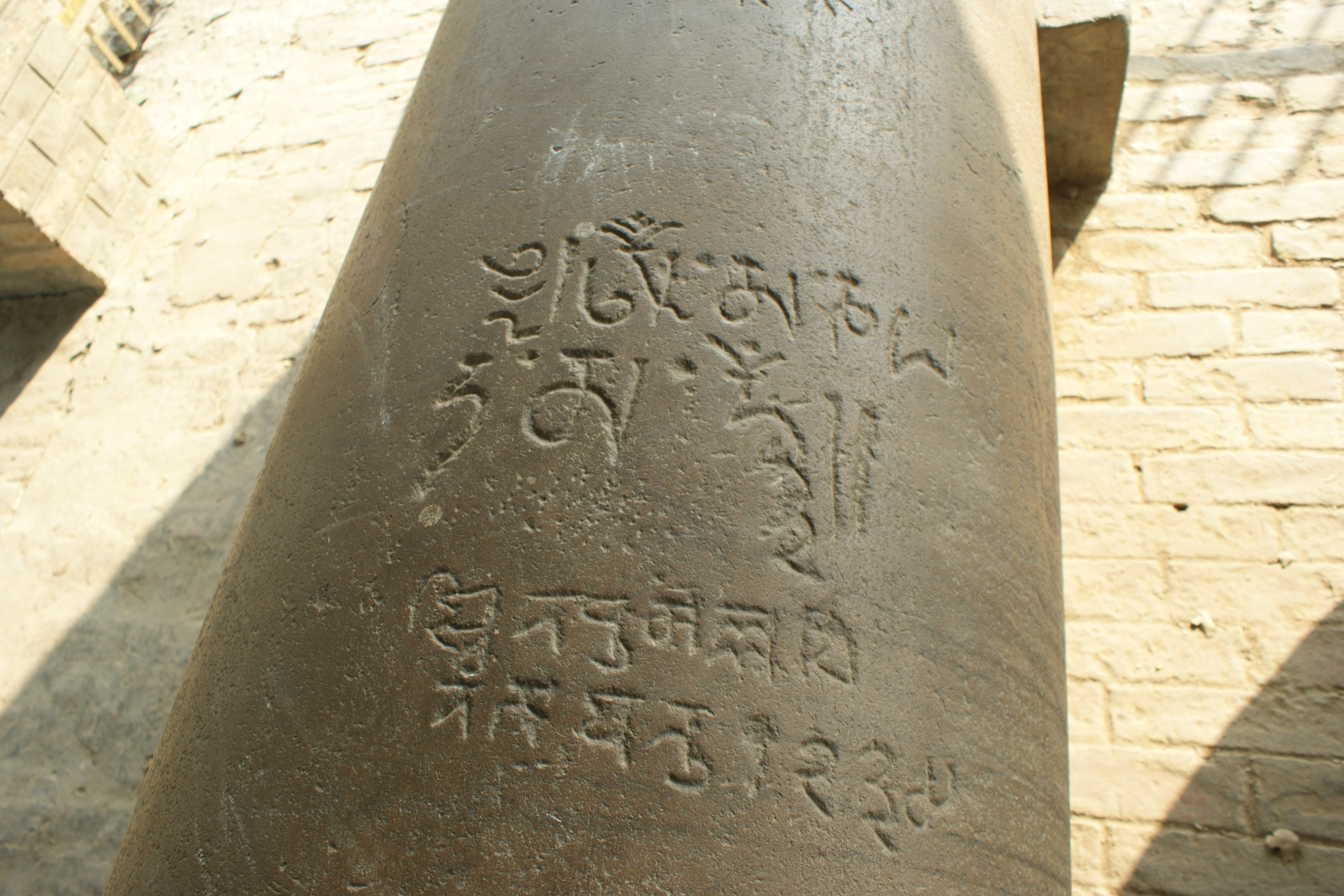
13th century inscription by King Ripu Malla

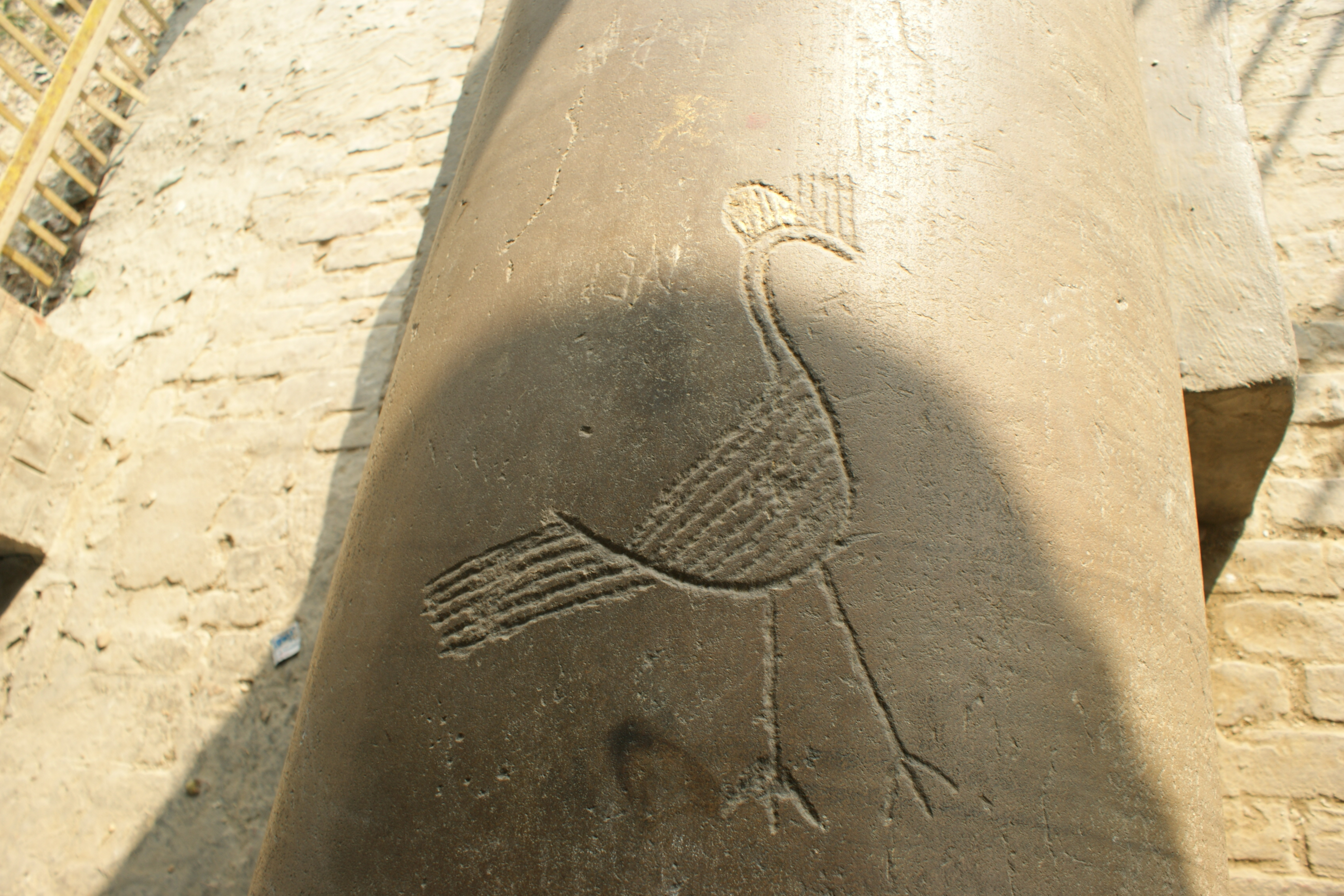
Inscription of a bird

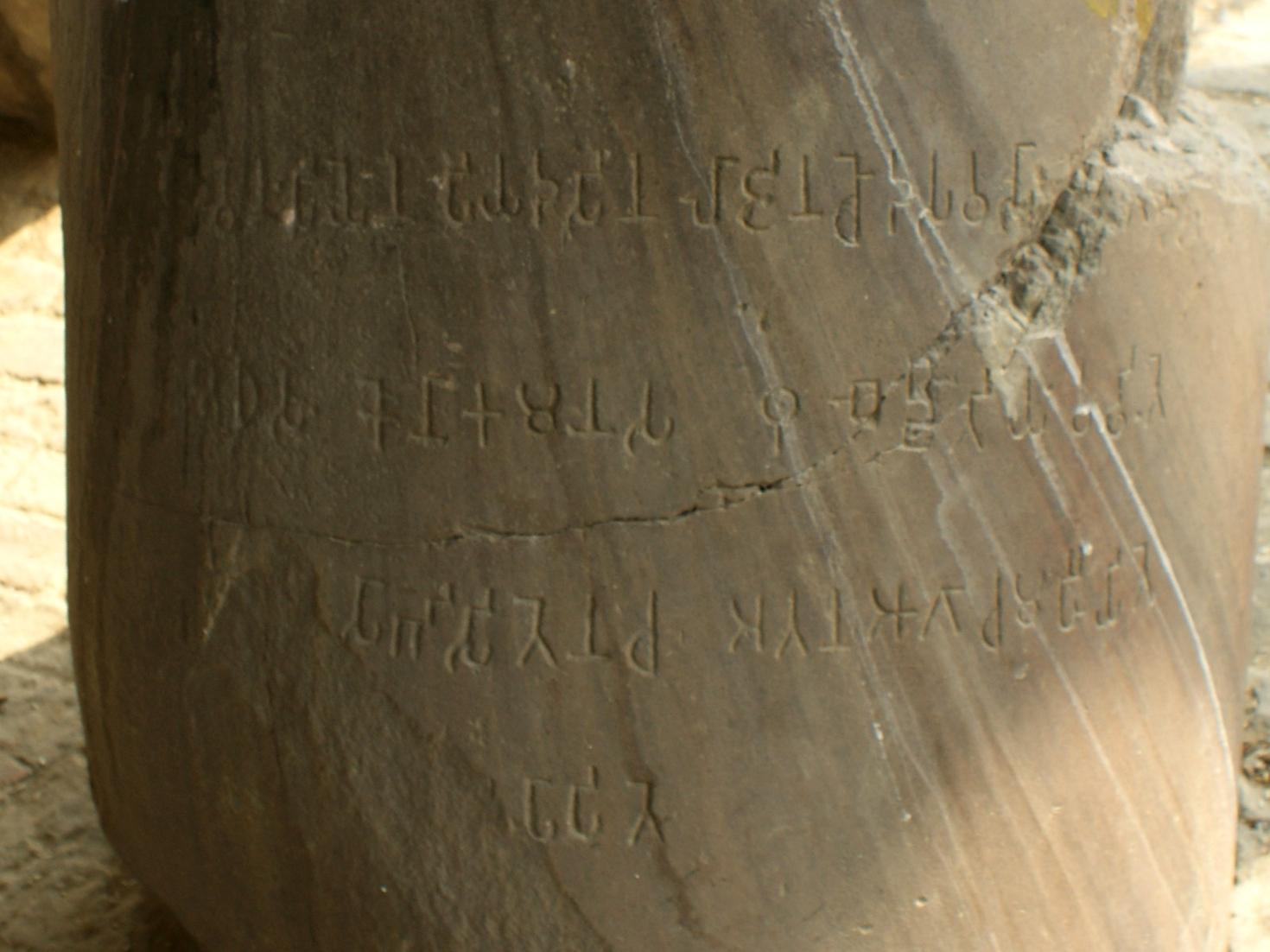
Inscription by Ashoka

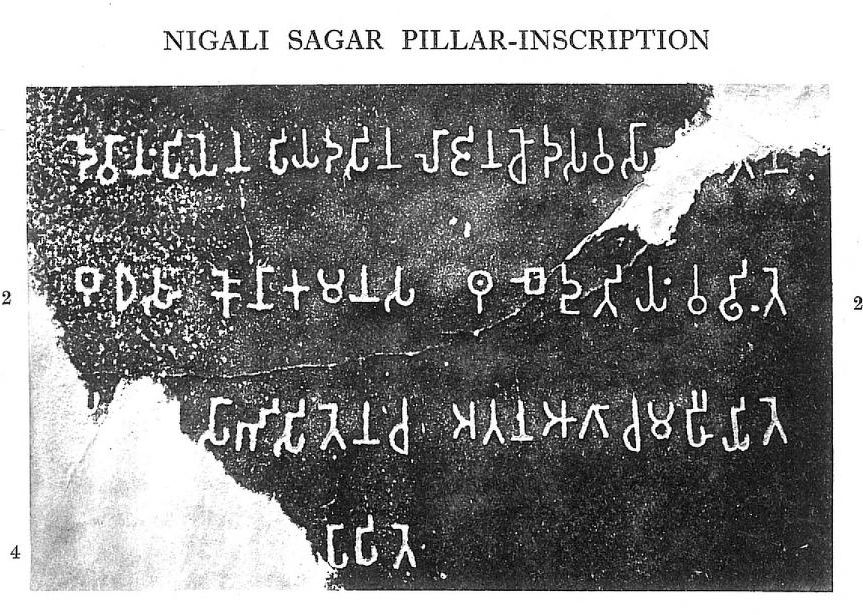
Rubbing of the inscription

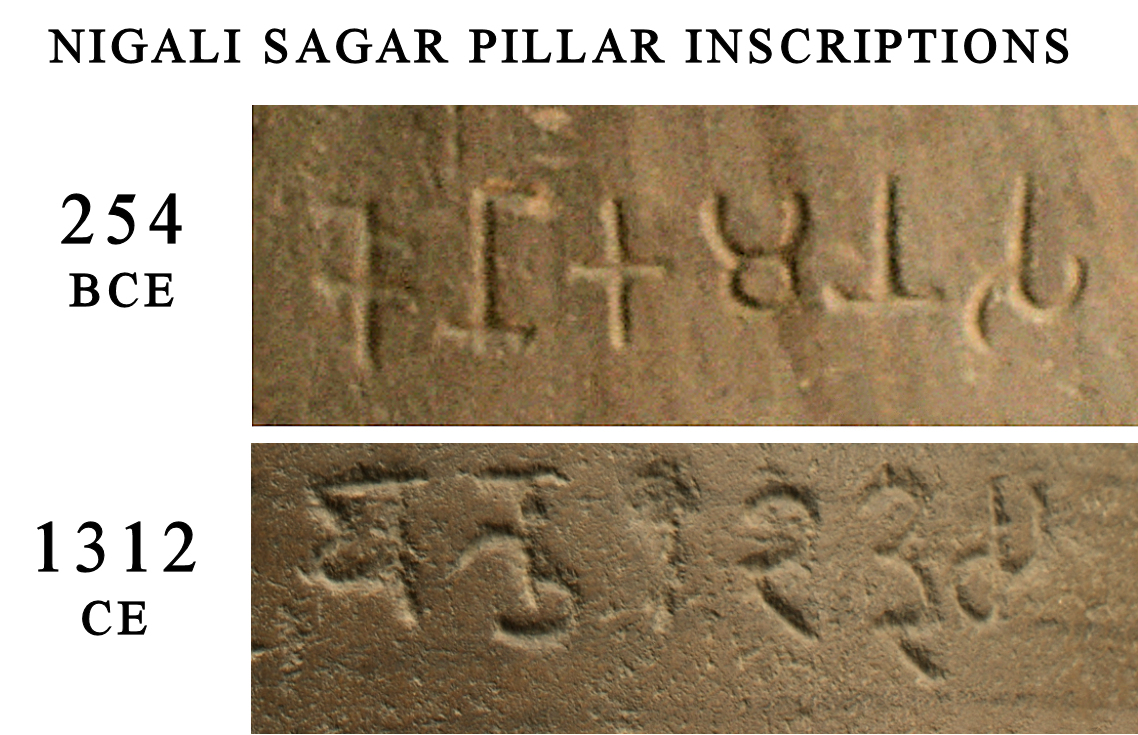
Nigali Sagar pillar inscriptions

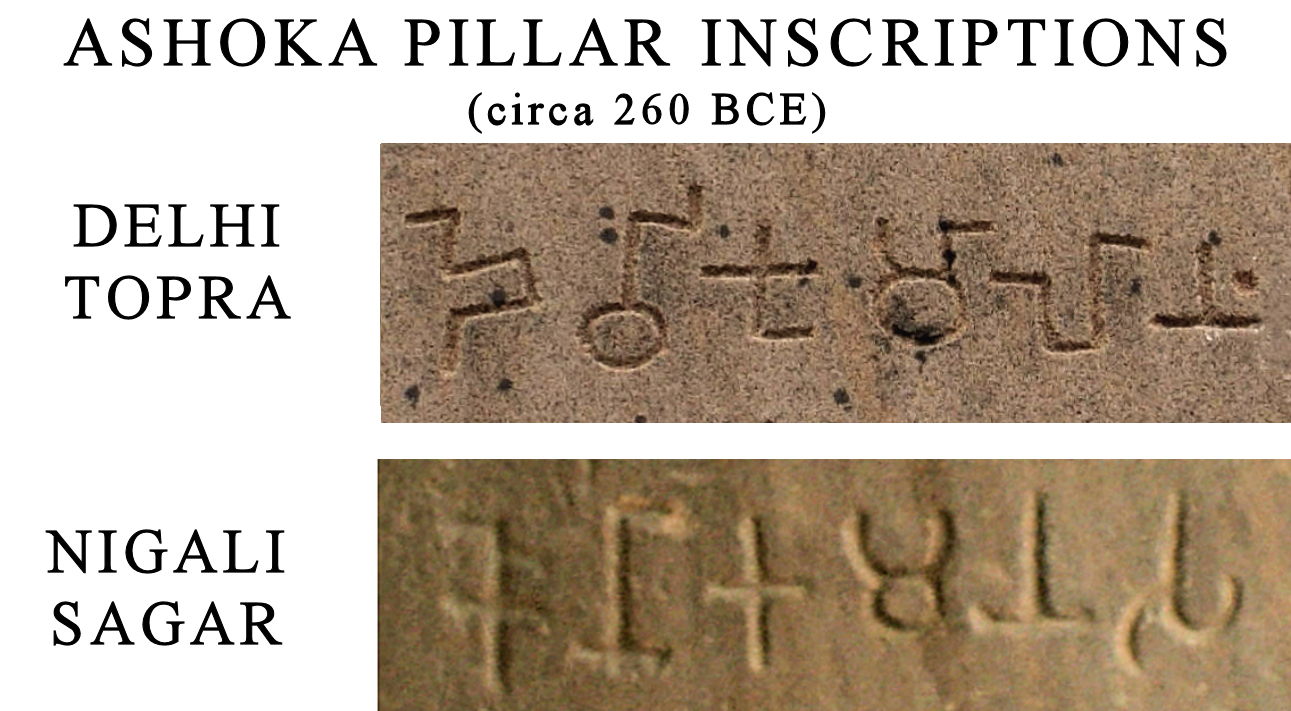
Ashoka pillar inscriptions

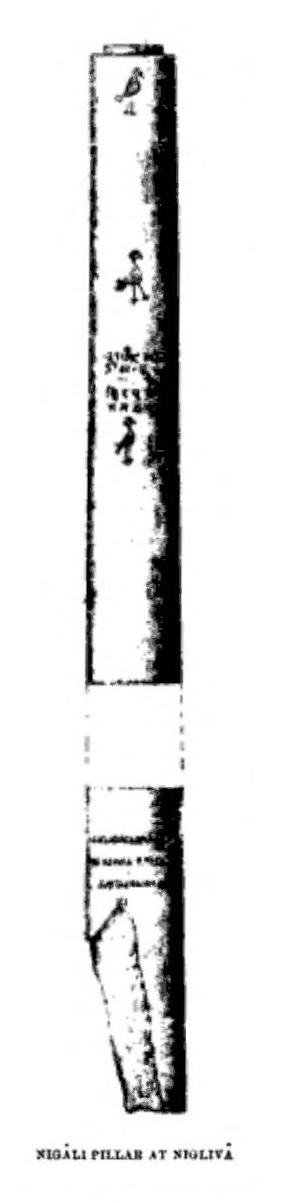
Nigali Sagar pillar plan

== See also ==
- Google location and photographs
