= Majri Kalan =

- Village
- Location in Rajasthan, India Majri Kalan (India)
- Coordinates: 27.9949546°N 76.3246517°E
- Country: India
- State: Rajasthan
- District: Alwar

Area
  - Total: 1.5 km^{2} (0.58 sq mi)
- Elevation: 273 m (896 ft)

Population (2011)
  - Total: 5,700
  - Density: 3,800/km^{2} (9,800/sq mi)

Languages
  - Official: Hindi
- Time zone: UTC+5:30 (IST)
- PIN: 301703
- ISO 3166 code: RJ-IN
- Vehicle registration: RJ 02

Majri Kalan is a village in Behror tehsil, Alwar district, in the state of Rajasthan, India. It is on National Highway No.8, 10 km from Neemrana.
