= Flying Fox Neemrana =

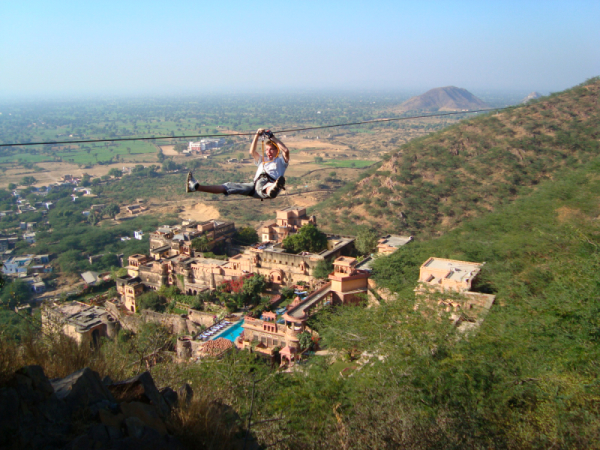
Flying Fox Neemrana

Flying Fox Neemrana is an Indian zipwire, dubbed India's first Zip Tour. The Zip Tour is located at Neemrana Fort Palace, in the village of Neemrana, India 122 kilometres (76 mi) south-west of New Delhi. The Zip Tour is situated on an outcrop of the Aravalli Range.

Flying Fox Neemrana was inaugurated on 18 January 2009 by Sri Banerjee, Secretary of Tourism, Government of India and Sir Richard Stagg KCMG, British High Commissioner to India.

== Location ==
The Zip Tour is located in Neemrana, with views of Neemrana Fort Palace, the Aravali Range and the surrounding countryside of Rajasthan.

== Lines ==
There are five lines at the location, navigated in a 2-3 hour tour.
