= Bansur =

- Town
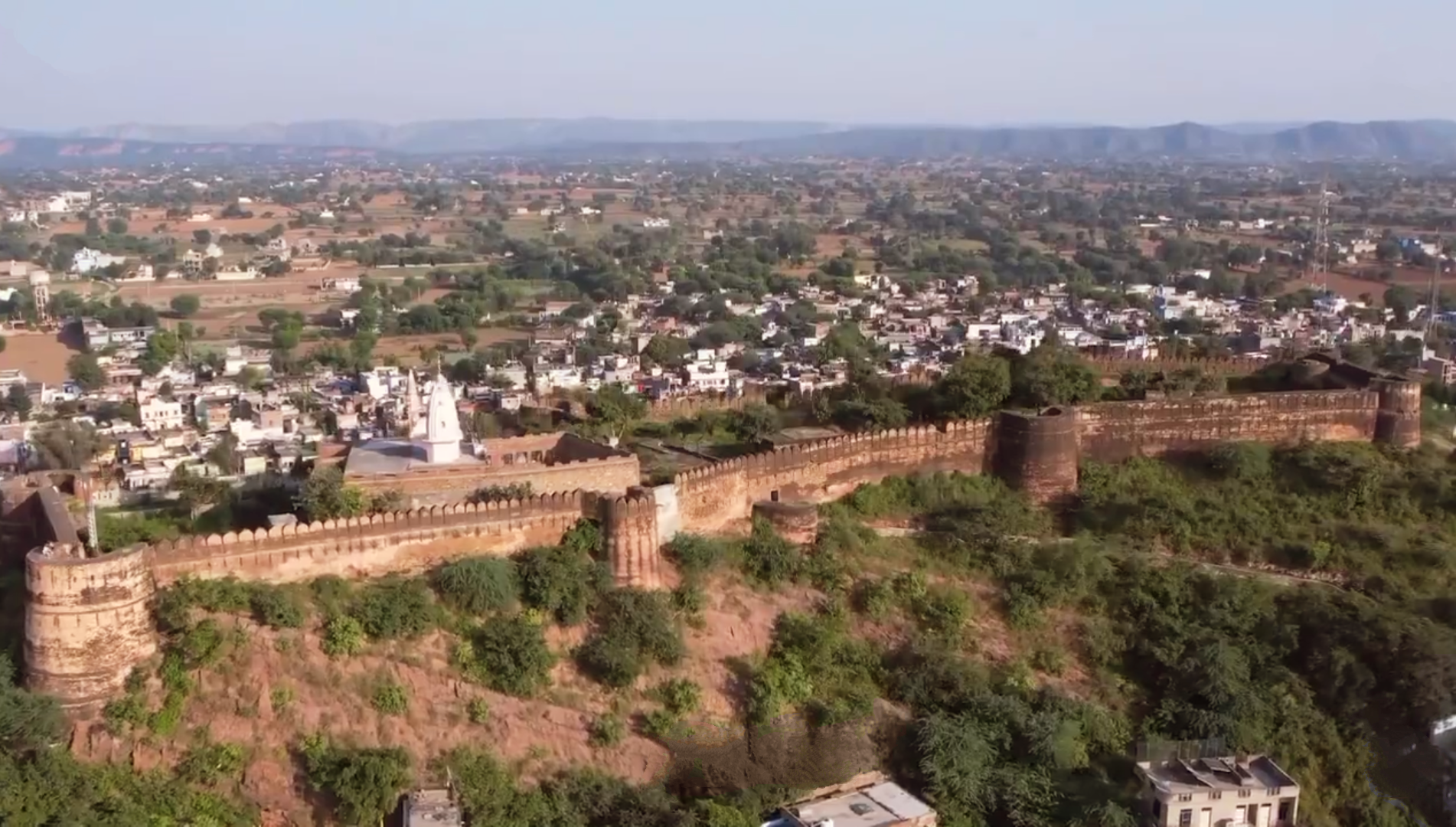
- An aerial view of Bansur Fort in Bansur, Kotputli-Behror district, Rajasthan

- Location in Rajasthan, India Bansur (India)
- Coordinates: 27.685°N 76.351°E
- Country: India
- State: Rajasthan
- District: Kotputli-Behror
- Tehsil: Bansur

Languages
  - Official: Hindi हिंदी, Ahirwati
- PIN: 301402
- Vehicle registration: RJ-02
- Lok Sabha constituency: Jaipur Rural
- Vidhan Sabha constituency: Bansur
- M.P.: Rao Rajendra Singh
- Assembly MLA: Devi Singh Sekhawat

Bansur is a town and tehsil in Kotputli-Behror district of Jaipur division in Indian state of Rajasthan.

Bansur is 17km from Kotputli city; 30km from Behror city, the district headquarters; 46km west of Alwar city; and 117km north-east of the state capital, Jaipur.
