= Rajnota =

- village
- Location in Rajasthan, India Rajnota (India)
- Coordinates: 27.6063°N 76.1777°E
- Country: India
- State: Rajasthan
- District: Jaipur

Population (2011)
  - Total: 10,000

Languages
  - Official: Hindi
- Time zone: UTC+5:30 (IST)
- PIN: 303110
- Telephone code: 01421
- Vehicle registration: RJ 32
- Website: www.rajnota.in

Rajnota is a village in Kotputli tehsil in Jaipur district in the Indian state of Rajasthan.

Rajnota is the oldest and biggest village of Rajputs (kshatriyas) in Kotputli. This village has three gram panchayats (Rajnota, Kairodi and half of Karoli). It is 15 kilometres (9.3 mi) from Kotputli and connected to the Jaipur-Delhi highway.

Rajnota is divided into approximately 500 dhani.

Rajnota is known as Soldier's village because 2000+ (on duty) Indian Army soldiers are garrisoned there.

== Temples ==
Shree Khem Sahab Maharaj temple is old and famous. Others include Hanuman Ji Temple, Shree Sati Mata Temple, Santoshi Mata Mandir, Rathod temple, Bajrangdas Baba temple, Khem Shaheb Baba mandir, Santoshi mata, the Hanuman ji statue of Kotputli, Radha Krishan Ji temple, Dhola Maharaj temple, Shiv temple

== Climate ==
Jaipur has a hot semi-arid climate (Köppen climate classification BSh) receiving over 65 cm or 26 in of rainfall during an average year but most rains occur in the monsoon months between June and September. Temperatures remain relatively high year-round, with the summer months of April to early July reaching 30 °C or 86 °F. The monsoon brings frequent, heavy rains and thunderstorms, but flooding is not common. The winter months of November to February offer average temperatures ranging from 15 to 18 °C (59.0 to 64.4 °F) and with little or no humidity. Occasional cold waves drop temperatures near freezing.

== Education ==
Five government and many private schools operate there. The village hosts a Government Senior Secondary School, Government Girls' School and Nav Jyoti Public Senior Secondary School, Sarvodya English Academy, Brilliant School Suryavanshi School, gurushikhar secondary school, Adarsh Gyan Mandir school and Bharti Sanskar School Rela etc.

== Demographics ==
At the 2011 India census, Rajnota had a population of 10,157. Hindi, Rajasthani and Marwari were the most common languages.
