= Jaliawas =

Jaliawas, Rewari
- Location within Haryana Location within India
- Coordinates: 28.102468°N 76.593590°E
- Country: India

Government
  - Body: Village panchayat

Population (2011)
  - Total: 1,188
- Time zone: UTC+5:30 (IST)
- PIN 123501: 12x xxx
- Website: www.rewari.gov.in

Jaliawas is situated in Rewari district, which is about 10.3 km from Rewari town. It is on Rewari-Bawal Road near Neemrana at 10.3 kilometres (6.4 mi) distance from Rewari in Bawal block.

== Demographics of 2011 ==
As of 2011 India census, Jaliawas, Rewari had a population of 1188 in 203 households. Males (614) constitute 51.68% of the population and females (574) 48.31%. Jaliawas has an average literacy (812) rate of 68.35%, lower than the national average of 74%: male literacy (479) is 58.99%, and female literacy (333) is 41% of total literates (812). In Jaliawas, Rewari, 12.37% of the population is under 6 years of age (147).

== Adjacent villages ==
- Bawal
- Bithwana
- Neemrana
- Karnawas
- Kasola
- Suthani
- Naichana
- Sulkha
