= Behror =

City in Rajasthan, India

Behror Bahror, Bhror, Bahroad
- City | Urban Area
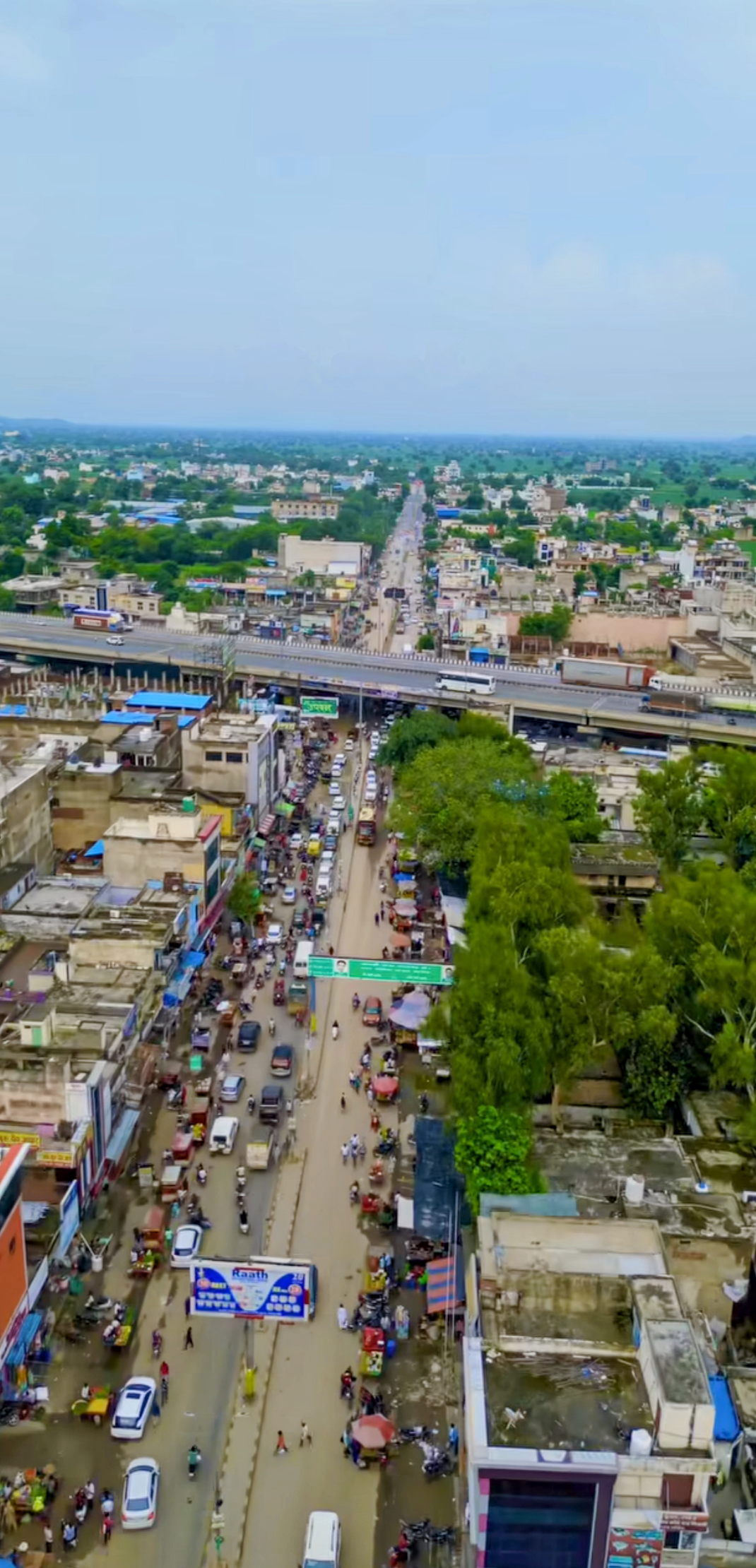
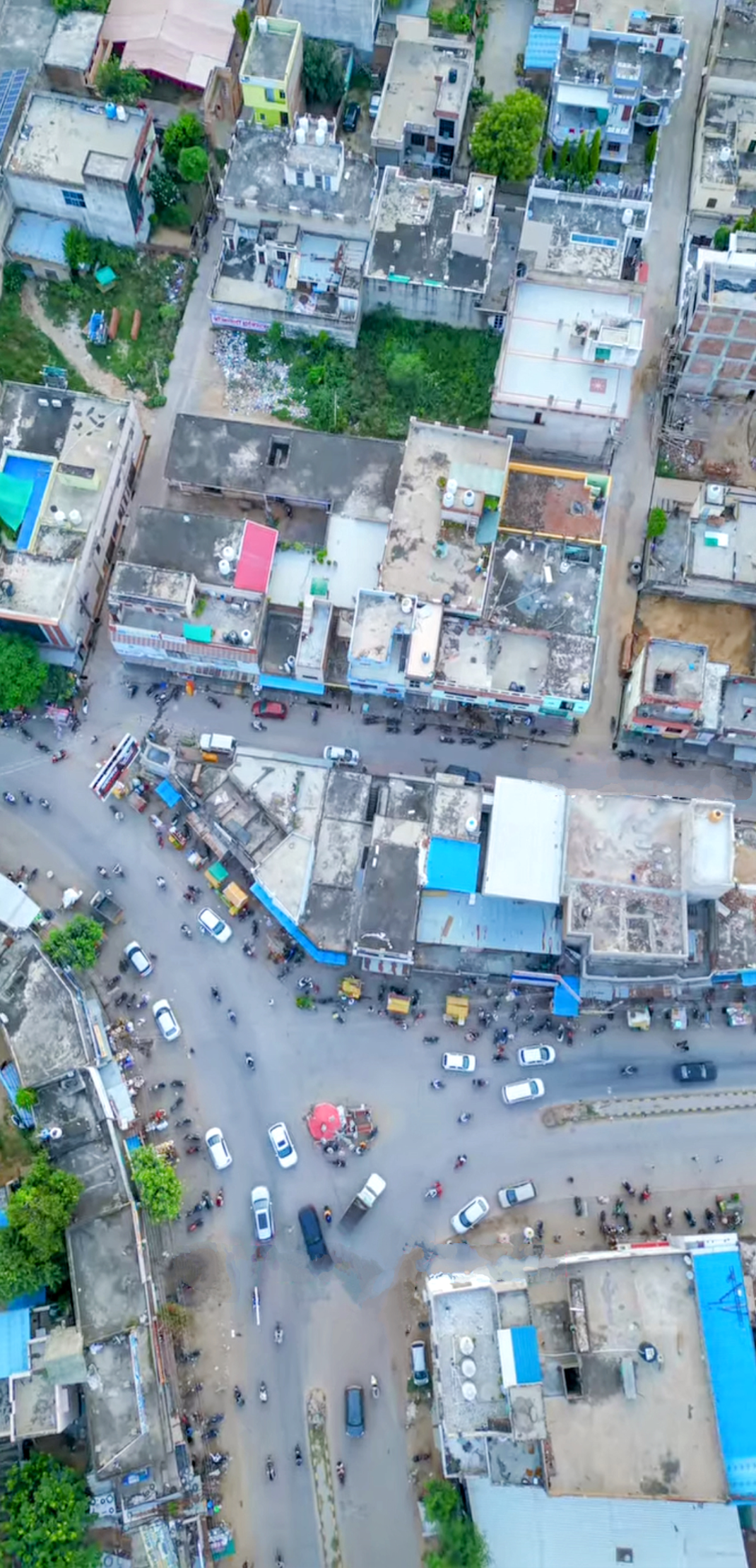
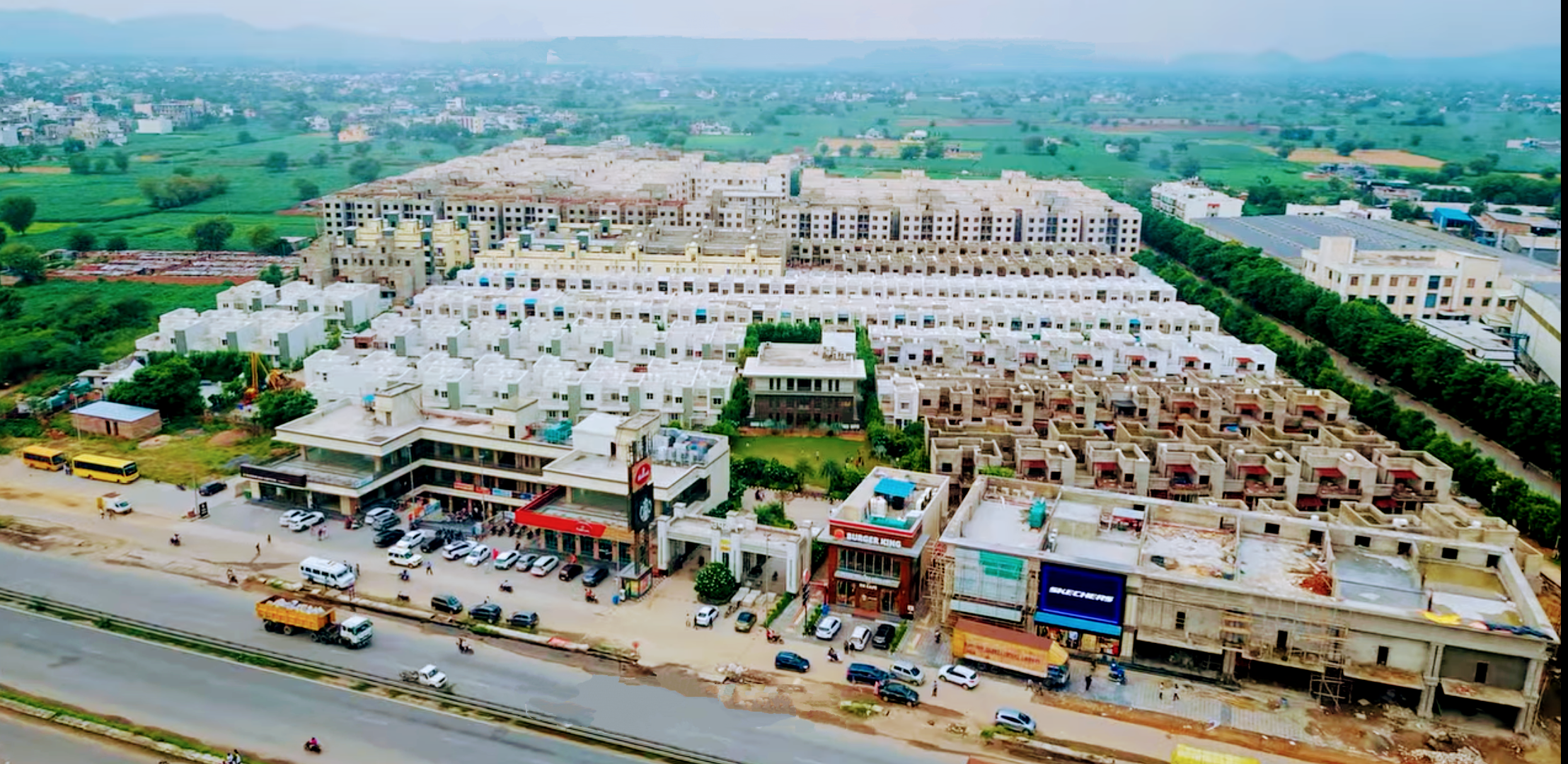
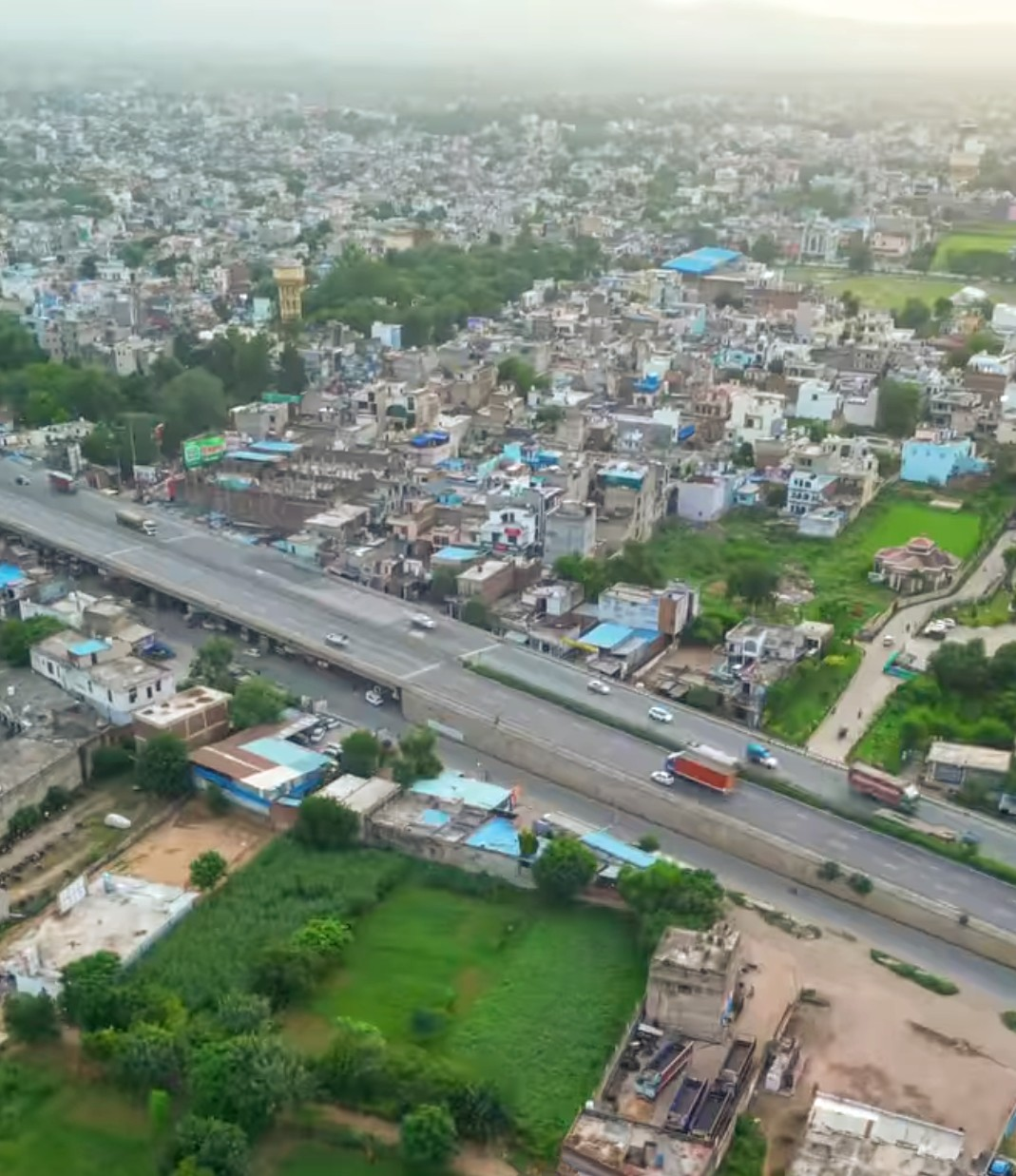
- Left to right: NH48 Highway Flyover at Behror (L), Old Busstop Circle on Shahid Marg Behror (R), RIICO Industrial area, View of Behror City from Rtech Plaza
- Nickname: Raath
- Behror in Rajasthan Behror (India)
- Coordinates: 27°53′25″N 76°17′10″E
- Country: India
- State: Rajasthan
- District: Kotputli-Behror
- Founded by: King Shaliwahan
- Named after: Mohalla Bhairunpur

Government
  - Type: Municipal Council
  - Body: Behror Municipal Council
- Elevation: 312 m (1,024 ft)

Population (2011)
  - Total: 29,531

Language
  - Official: Hindi
  - Regional: Rajasthani, Ahirwati
- Time zone: UTC+5:30 (IST)
- PIN: 301701
- Telephone code: (+91)-1494
- Vehicle registration: RJ32
- Nearest railway station: Narnaul railway station (20 km away)
- Nearest International airport: Indira Gandhi International Airport (115 km away)
- Nearest Airport: Bachhod Airstrip (25 km away)
- Website: Municipal Council Behror

Behror (IPA: [bɛɦɾoːɽ]) is a city in the Kotputli-Behror district of Rajasthan of the Jaipur division. It serves as the administrative headquarters of the eponymous Behror tehsil and shares headquarters for Kotputli-Behror district with Kotputli. It is equidistant from both the state capital Jaipur and the national capital New Delhi. Located 120 km southwest of New Delhi and a part of National Capital Region, it is regulated under National Capital Region Planning Board which is a federal authority for urban planning purposes in NCR. Along with Shahjahanpur and Neemrana, it is grouped as SNB Complex (Shahjahanpur-Neemrana-Behror) of NCR- which includes 137 revenue villages, in which Behror municipality is the largest urban conglomeration. This region is also known as 'Ahirwal region' or simply as Raath and is an important industrial hub for the state of Rajasthan. Behror municipality spreads out in an area of 15 km^{2} is divided into four revenue villages namely Behror tarf Gangabishan, Behror tarf Doongrasi, Behror tarf Nainsukh, Behror tarf Balram.

== Toponym ==
According to the most commonly accepted legend, the name "Behror" is thought to be derived from a corruption of the word 'Bhairun' in the name "Mohalla Bhairunpura". Mohalla Bhairunpura was named after Bhairun temple in the city established by King Shalivahan.

== History ==
In and around the Sahibi River Basin which flows near to Behror city, several late Harappan period pottery and archaeological artefacts have been found.

Behror and the surrounding region formed the southern fringe of the Bhramvrat described in Manusmriti, though due to varied interpretations the precise location and size of the Brahmvrata region has been the subject of academic uncertainty. Dhosi Hill in the nearby city of Narnaul is an extinct volcano of the Aravali Range and has been referred to be abode of many rishis in ancient Indian texts, chief among them Maharishi Chyawan. Khetri is a copper age settlement around 60 km away. Matsya-Bairath region of which it is part has been numerously referenced in Mahabharata and Manusmriti.

Around 9th century AD, regions north-west of Sahibi River were ruled by King Mauradhwaj and was succeeded by King Shaliwahan who established two new cities, Kot and Shaliwahapur. Kot whose remains are found in present Singhali village of Mundawar tehsil. While, Mohalla Bhairunpura in Shaliwahpur later came to be known as Behror city.

During later part of Mughal rule over Delhi Sultanate, this region rapidly underwent change of rulers due to wars between Mughal and Maratha armies, in such fights around late 18 and early 19th century the main fort of the city called "Mitti Ka Qila" in Garh Mohalla was permanently destroyed and the businesses suffered heavy losses from which town took a long time to recover subsequently.

Rao Mitra Sen, an Ahir from Behror, was minister under Rao Bhawani Singh and Rao Dilel Singh of Rewari. He became the ruler of Ahirwal in 18th century with capital at Rewari. He also fought in the Battle of Mandan and annexed Mandan, Jhunjhunu etc. In 1785, a Maratha expedition to Rewari was repelled by Rao Mitra Sen of Rewari.

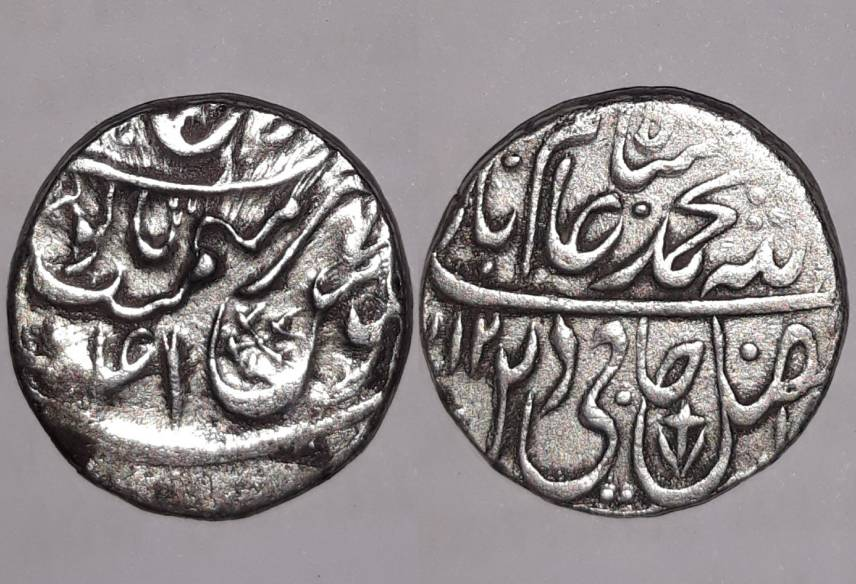
Gokul Sikka 2 - Rewari

With the establishment of Alwar princely state by Naruka Clan descendant Rao Raja Pratap Singh, the areas surrounding Alwar were consolidated either by War or treaty after the waning of Mughal Power, loss of Maratha in North and ascendancy of British Power. During the reign of Rao Pratap Singh (Ruler of Alwar), Behror and surrounding Bansur area were incorporated in Alwar princely state.

After the battle of Laalsevadi in 1803 against Marathas by British, Behror was given back to Ahmed Bakshkhan of Alwar princely state as a gift of service rendered by Alwar princely state in help of British against Marathas. This battle of Laalsevadi is important as Marathas' defeat in this battle rendered their hold on North India weak while the British subsequently strengthened their hold on Delhi.

Before independence, Behror was a Tehsil and urban center under Alwar State.

In first freedom movement, Pran Sukh Yadav, who fought along with Rao Tula Ram against the British in an 1857 freedom struggle at the Battle of Naseebpur near Behror in Narnaul, hailed from Behror tehsil and was important in raising local population of Aheers against British.

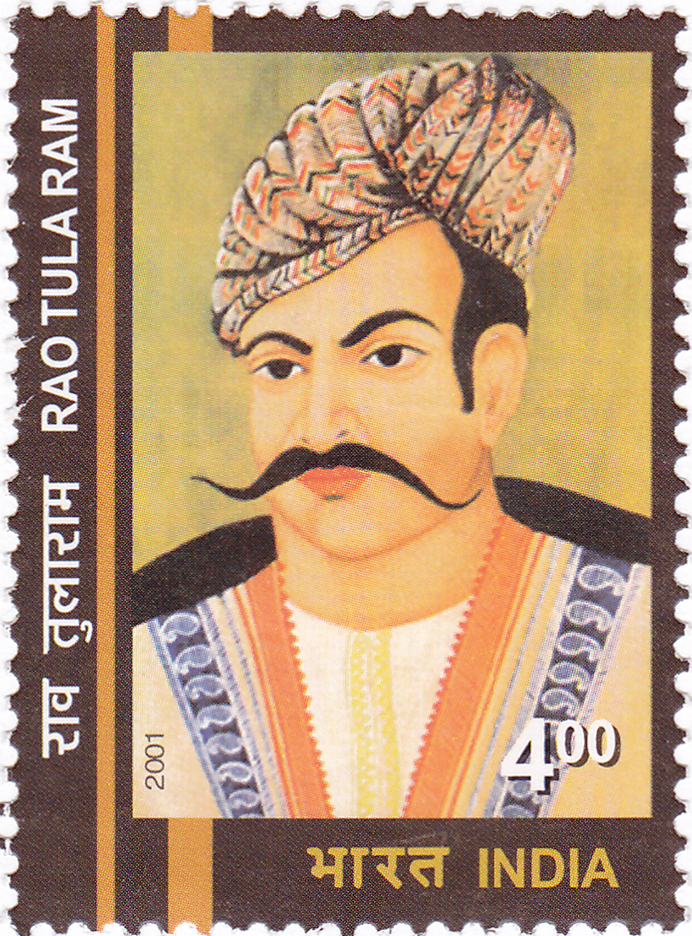
Raja Rao Tula Ram

After independence, and in the subsequent accession of Alwar state to Indian Union on 1 July 1947 it became part of newly formed Republic of India. In 1948, it became part of the United States of Matsya under Indian Union which was formed through a covenant with Union Government of India by states of Alwar, Bharatpur, Dholpur and Karauli with capital being Alwar. Then one year later in 1949, these were again merged with other princely states of Rajputana to form Rajasthan and through this Behror came to be part of Rajasthan state. In 1953, Behror along with Alwar were again considered to be included in to be formed Brij Pradesh or Greater Delhi by State Reorganisation Commission but those proposals were never implemented and subsequently dropped.

Behror has remained an important center in the Ahirwal region and as a part of the larger Matsya Region, also due to proximity to Delhi. The years in the late 20th century show rapid changes in the town with establishment of RIICO Industrial Zones new avenues of commercial activity were born and were reflected in the sharp variation in population figures after it.

Since independence, Behror has been a part of Alwar district but in 2023, Behror along with Kotputli were declared as one of the 19 new districts of Rajasthan. The governing body of the city was changed from Municipality to Municipal Council on 17 August 2023 by order of the Governor of Rajasthan.

== Geography ==
Located at co-ordinates 27.88°N 76.28°E. with an average elevation of 312 metres (1,024 ft) Behror sits amidst generally plain and very fertile agricultural land with Aravali Range mountains running north–south approximately 5 km to west of Behror.

According to CGWA, it has been identified as an area for regulating withdrawal of ground water (Dark Zone) since there are limited surface water resources and mostly ground water is used as main source of water. Sahibi River, which is an ephemeral river flows 10 km south-east of Behror, flowing south-west to north-east. Usually these days it is dry. Sota river is 7 km to south- west of Behror and drains in Sahibi river. The main water bodies of the city are:

1. Sesada
2. Bhojada
3. Govind Devji Pond
4. Hanuman Mandir Pond

The climate is mostly dry, and mainly summer, winter and a short rainy season are the main seasons, winter starts from November and till March, summer remains till July. January is the coldest month when it may get as cold as 2 °C. Around four-fifths of the average rainfall is received in July, August and September.

The soil is highly fertile and agriculture is one of the main occupation in the region. Mattiyar, a type of loamy soil, is most commonly found in Behror.

The city falls under Seismic Activity Zones 4 with some area of Tahsil under Zone 3 and another under Zone 4.

Forests are mainly of deciduous hilly type found along tracts of Aravalli hills with dominant trees being kikar, neem and dhak. Main mineral found is quartz. There has been rapid changes in the environment surrounding city due to rapid urbanisation and increased pollution.

== Administration ==
Behror City is a Municipal Council administered city according to Rajasthan Government classification system and is proposed to become a Regional Centre city.

Eponymous Behror tehsil is an administrative unit comprising Behror city and surrounding gram panchayats/villages. Behror Legislative constituency is the political constituency including Behror city and surrounding villages for election of representative to State legislature.

=== Behror municipality ===
The Behror municipality – which is Behror city proper – is divided into 25 wards for which elections are held every five years.

==== Behror Legislative Constituency ====
Behror Legislative Constituency is categorised as rural seat in Legislative constituency classification. There are a total of 211,534 voters in the seat, which includes 110,515 male voters, and 101,019 female voters. In the 2018 Rajasthan elections, Behror recorded a voter turnout of 74.69%. In 2013 the turnout was 76%, and in 2008 it was 69%.

==== Behror Tehsil ====
Behror Tehsil comprises 62 Gram panchayats and 64 Patwar circles with ILR Code - 5.

== Economy ==
Agriculture, manufacturing and services are the major contributors to the GDP. Behror is a leading producer of mustard and wheat. Apart from this, it also plays an important role in the production of cotton. Due to rapid development waste disposal has become a problem in the municipality and wider region with no proper waste disposal sites.

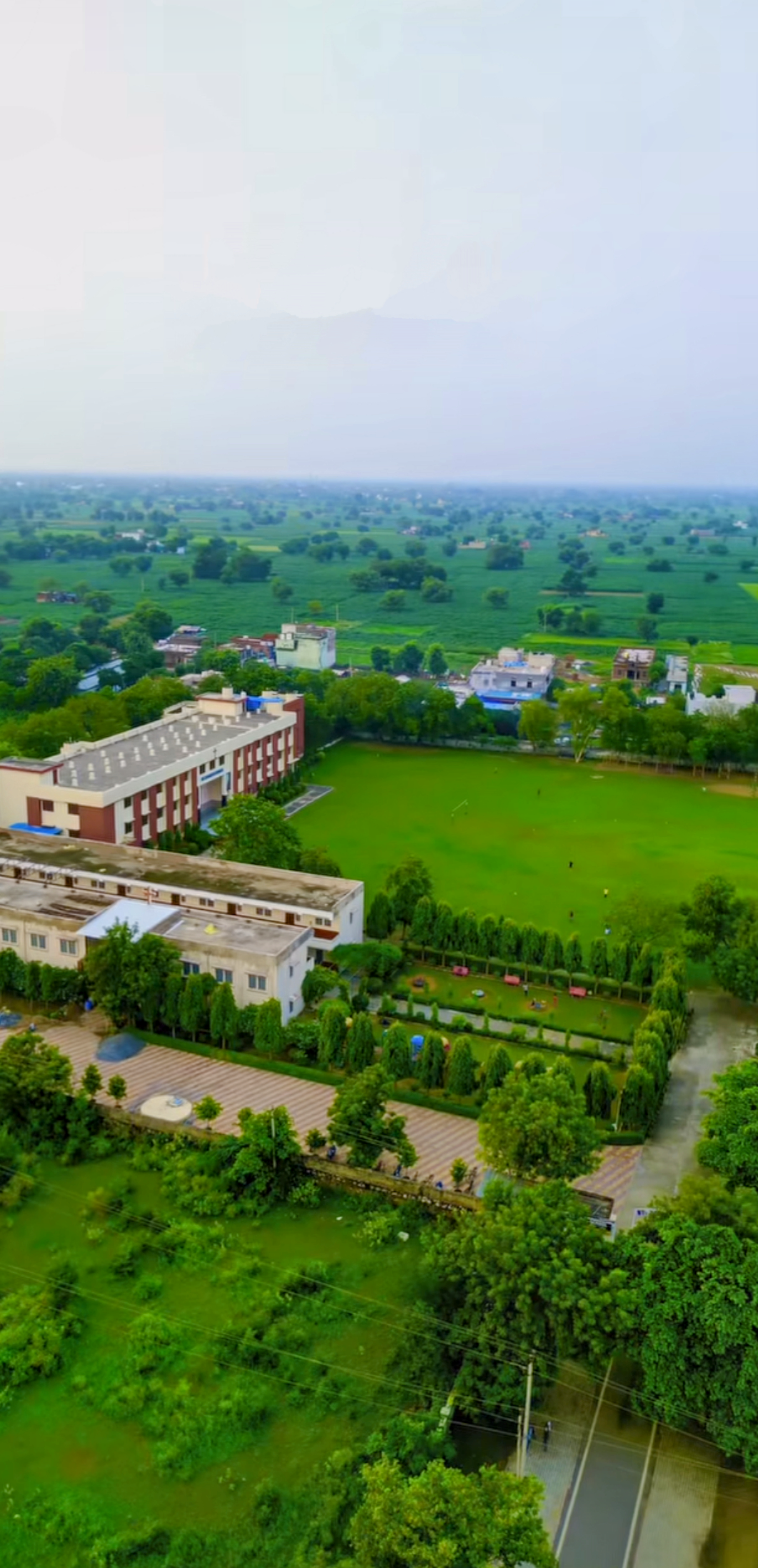
Drone View of Xaviers School Behror towards Rewali

== Transportation ==
Behror municipality is well connected to major Urban conglomerations in the area.

=== Roadways ===
The most important connecting road is six-lane NH-8 (NH - 48) which passes through the city connects it to Delhi to the North-East and Jaipur to the South-West. This important link is a part of the Golden Quadrilateral project of NHAI. RTDC run Hotel Midway is situated on NH-8 in Behror.

Behror is midway between Jaipur and Delhi, at a distance of 130 km from the State Capital and 120 km from the National Capital.

Behror has direct connectivity to Alwar city which is 60 km away. Behror Tehsil borders Haryana's Narnaul district and is connected to Narnaul City by State Highway - 14.

MDR (Major District Road) - 78 road connects Behror to Rewari and Inland Container Depot at Kathuwas to North and Nangal Chaudhary to South.

=== Railways ===
Nearest major Railway station is Narnaul railway station 25 km away on Phulera-Rewari-Delhi Railway Line. Inland Container Depot is located in Kathuwas 25 km away on Western Dedicated Freight Corridor DMRC project. Integrated Multimodal Logistics hub at Nangal Chaudhary is 20 km away.

=== Airways ===
The nearest airport is Indra Gandhi International Airport which is 110 km towards Delhi on Jaipur- Delhi Highway. Nearest Airstrip is Bacchod Airstrip of 3000 feet at Bachhod Village of Mahendragarh District around 25 km away. Another international airport is proposed at Kotkasim of Khairthal district which is only 50 km away.

== Landmarks and monuments ==
=== Forts ===
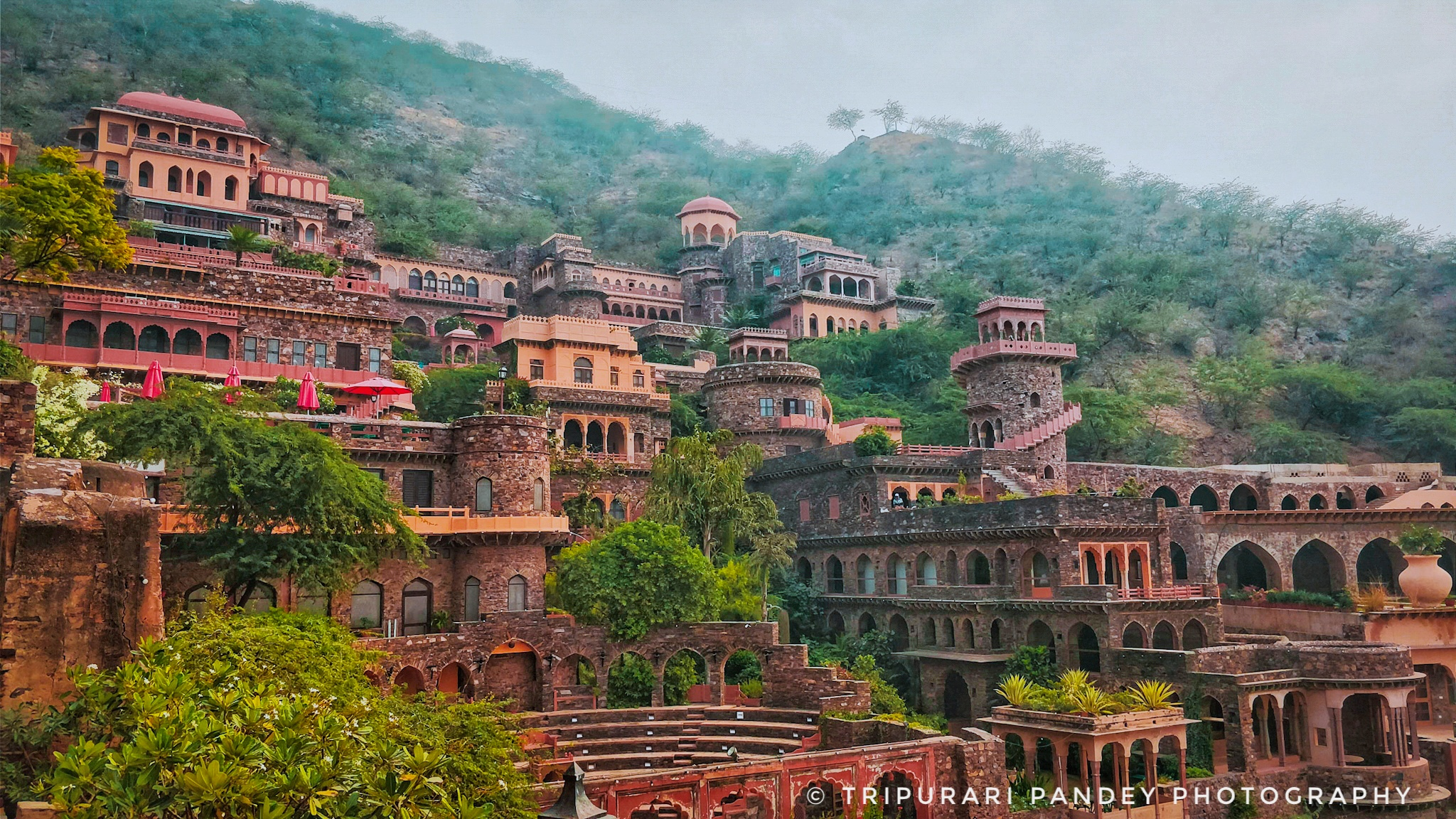
Neemrana Fort

Neemrana Fort Complex located 10 km away is the most important Landmark. The famous Neemrana fort was built in the 16th century and was occupied by Chouhan Rajputs till 1947.

Taseeng Fort located in Aravali hills 5 km away is another place of attraction but now in poor condition due to neglect. It was owned by Badgurjar ( Raghav ) Rajputs Clan, Present Head Thakur Mohan Singh Raghav ( Former Additional Advocate General ) his wife Sada Kanwar was the Sister of Former Vice President of India & Former Chief Minister of Rajasthan Late Shri Bhairon Singh Shekhawat.

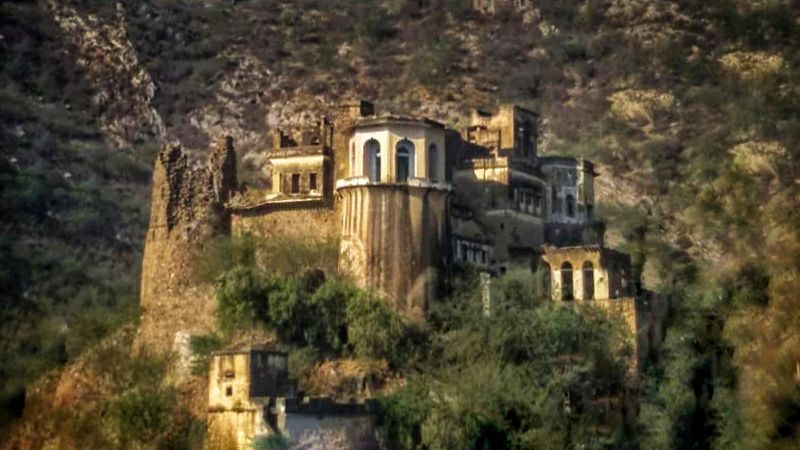
Taseeng Fort

=== Temples ===
Mansa Devi Temple in Dahmi is thronged by devotees far and wide during Navratris. It is a 637-year-old temple.

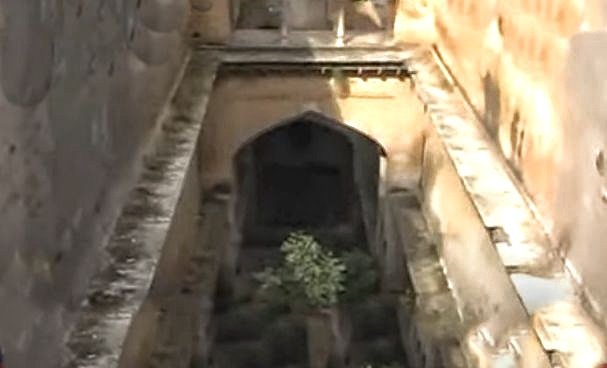
Taseeng Baori

Jeelani Mata Mandir built 500 years ago located behind Kutchery is another historical temple.

== Demographics ==
According to 2011 Indian Census, Behror Municipality had population of 29,531 of which 15,570 were males and 13,961 were females. Children between the age of 0 to 6 years were 3770 which is 12.77% of total population. Female sex ratio was of 897. The total number of literates Behror was 21,656, which constituted 73.33% of the total population with male literacy of 80.04% and female literacy of 65.85%. The effective literacy rate of 7+ population of Behror was 84.1%, of which male literacy rate was 92.4% and female literacy rate was 75.1%. The Scheduled Castes and Scheduled Tribes have a population of 4,466 and 940 respectively. Behror municipality has total administration over 5,484 houses. The population of Behror fell in the first decades of 20th century attributable to the reasons of Influenza outbreaks in 1918, Plague outbreak in 1907, and deaths of enlisted soldiers in Rajputana units in the battlefields of World War 1 and China War in 1900, indeed this was true of most of Alwar state and Rajputana.

Decadal population growth in Behror municipality

Year	Pop.	±%
1801	5,710	—
1881	5,533	−3.1%
1901	5,540	+0.1%
1911	5,253	−5.2%
1921	4,108	−21.8%

Year	Pop.	±%
1941	-	—
1951	4,465	—
1961	5,462	+22.3%
1971	6,868	+25.7%
1981	9,653	+40.6%

Year	Pop.	±%
1991	16,238	+68.2%
2001	22,856	+40.8%
2011	29,531	+29.2%

=== Languages ===
Hindi is being the official language of city. Rajasthani is the most spoken language of the city. But in this border area most common vernacular language - Raathi/Ahirwati - has influences of administrative Hindi, Haryanvi / Bangru, Mewati. It is influenced by Bangru the most, and seems rough to people not used to it.

== Culture and festivals ==
The Rath cattle fair is organised in the month of May for the improvement of the Rath breed in Kotputli-Behror district.

== See also ==
- Neemrana
- Kotputli
- Bansur
- Viratnagar
- Mundawar
- Alwar
- Jaipur
- Shimla
