= Kotputli-Behror district =

District in Rajasthan, India

Kotputli-Behror district Kot Behror
- District of Rajasthan
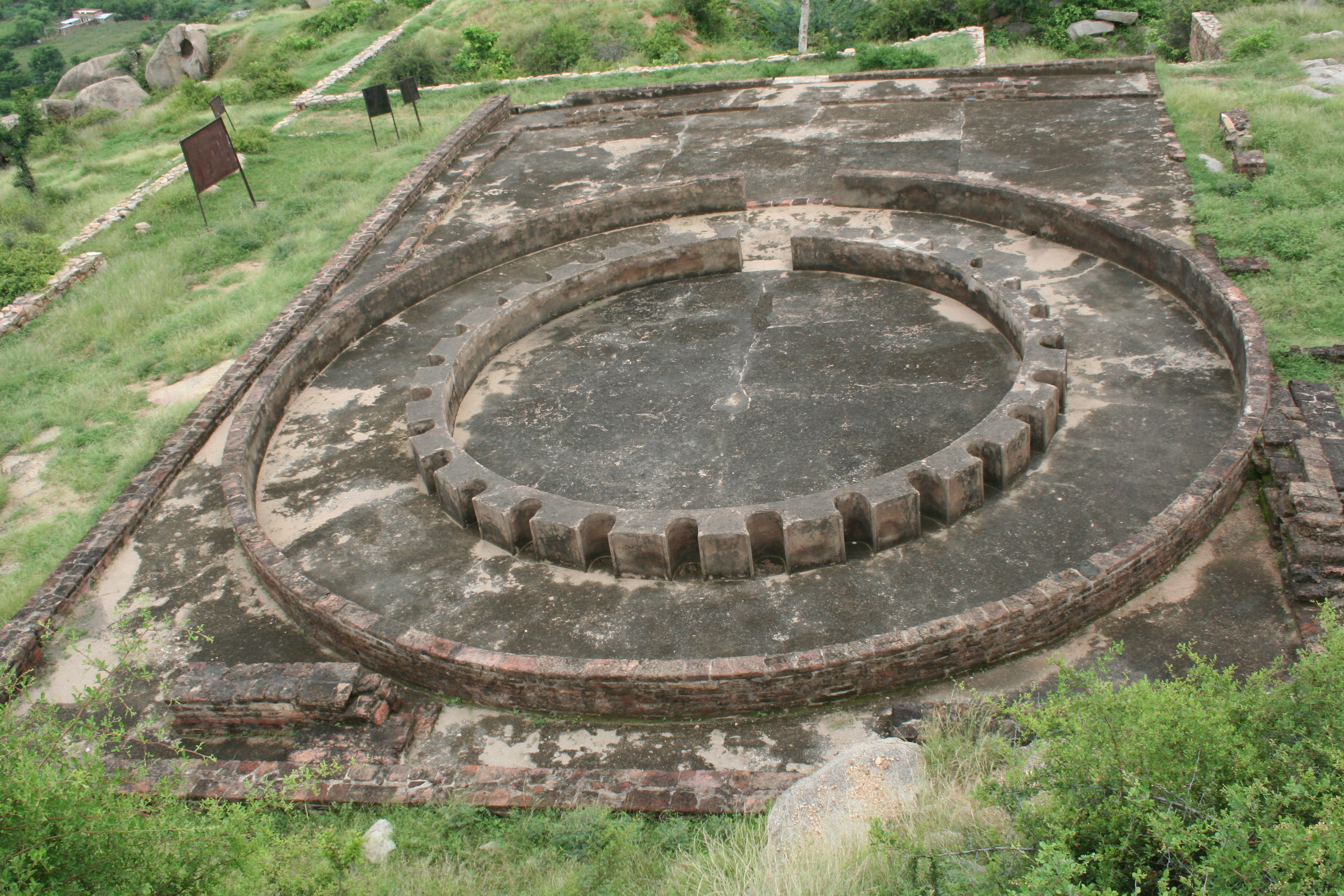
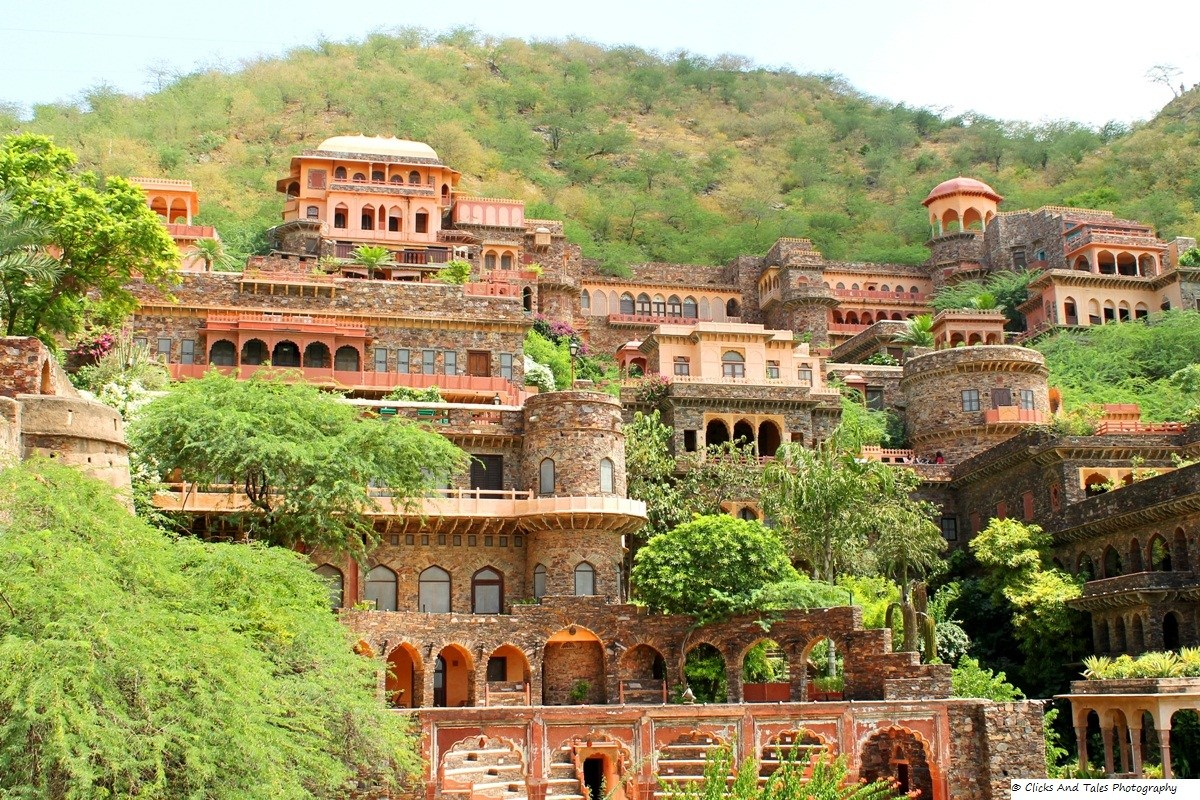
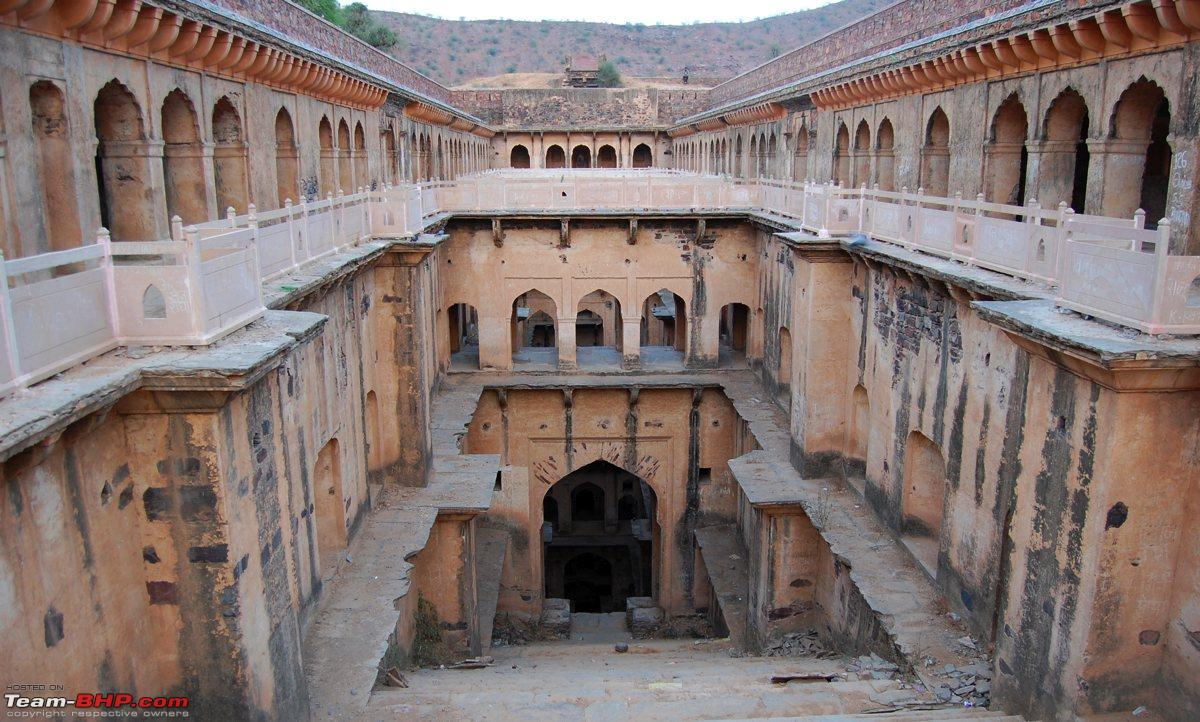
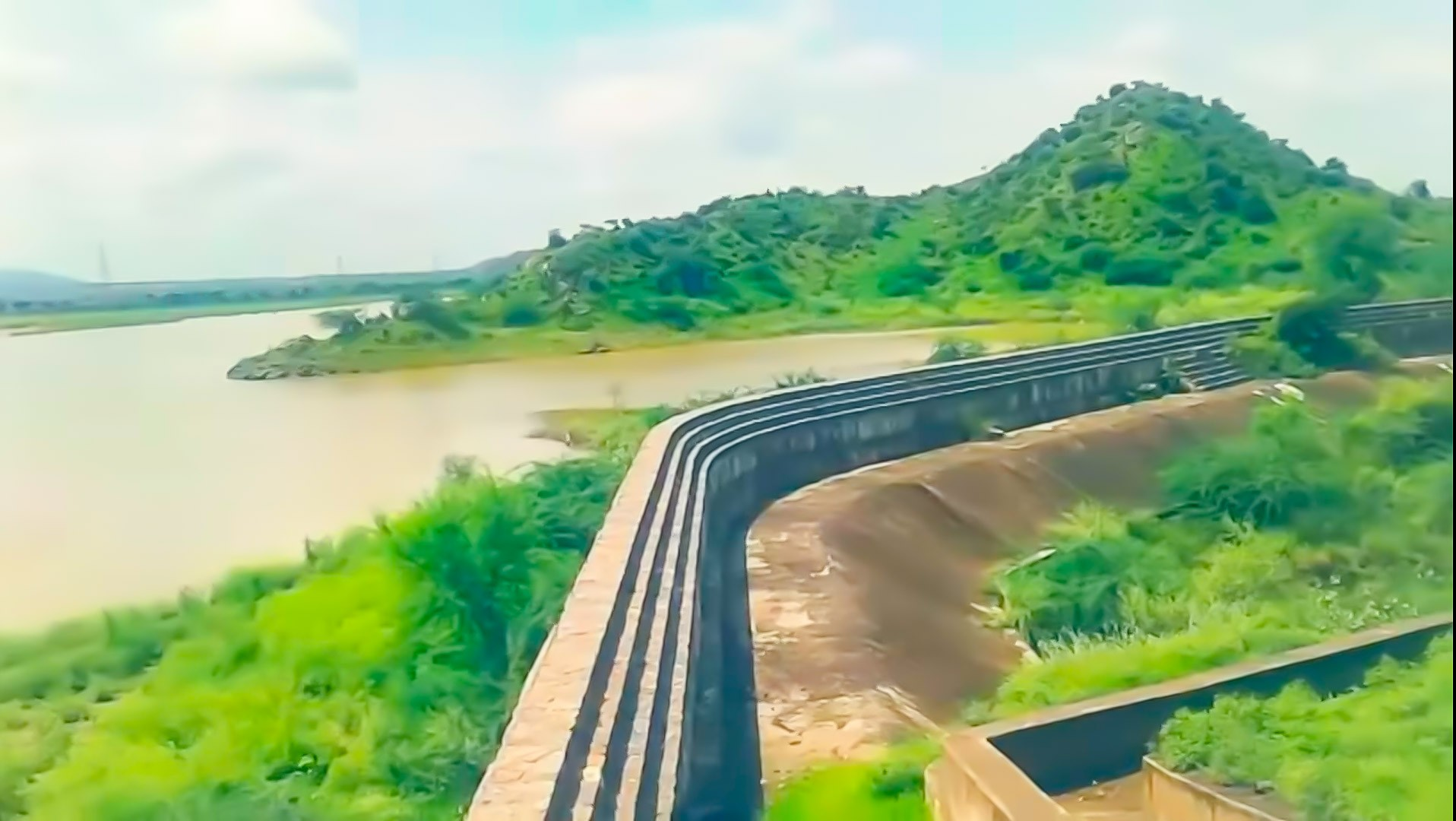
- Clockwise from top-left: Bairat Temple, Neemrana Fort, Neemrana Baori Buchara Dam
- Nicknames: Sabi Kantha, Rath, Kotbehror, Kot, Bairath
- Coordinates (Kotputli-Behror district): 27.8867°N 76.2834°E
- Country: India
- State: Rajasthan
- Division: Jaipur
- Established: 7 August 2023
- Headquarters: Kotputli
- Tehsils: Kotputli, Behror, Bansur, Neemrana, Paota, Viratnagar, Mandhan, Narayanpur

Government
  - District Magistrate: Priyanaka Goswami IAS
- Time zone: UTC+5:30 (IST)
- PIN: 30310X, 30170X
- Vehicle registration: RJ32
- Major highways: National Highway 48 (NH-48), National Highway 148B (NH-148B)
- Website: Official website

Kotputli-Behror is a district in the state of Rajasthan. This district was carved out of Jaipur district and Alwar district and was formally established on 7 August 2023. It is located in north-eastern Rajasthan. The district is surrounded on three sides by the Aravali Ranges with Sabi river flowing through it. It comprises the tehsils of Kotpulti, Behror, Neemrana, Bansur, Mandhan, Paota, Viratnagar and Narayanpur. The district headquarters are jointly located at Behror and Kotputli.

Piyadasi as a name of Emperor Ashoka was mentioned in the Bhabru rock edicts found in the district. A major part of the district comprising Tehsils of Behror, Neemrana, Bansur, Mandhan and is referred to as Rath Region though Mundawar tehsil of Rath region was made part of separate district of Khairthal.

== Administrative Divisions ==
The district has eight tehsils:

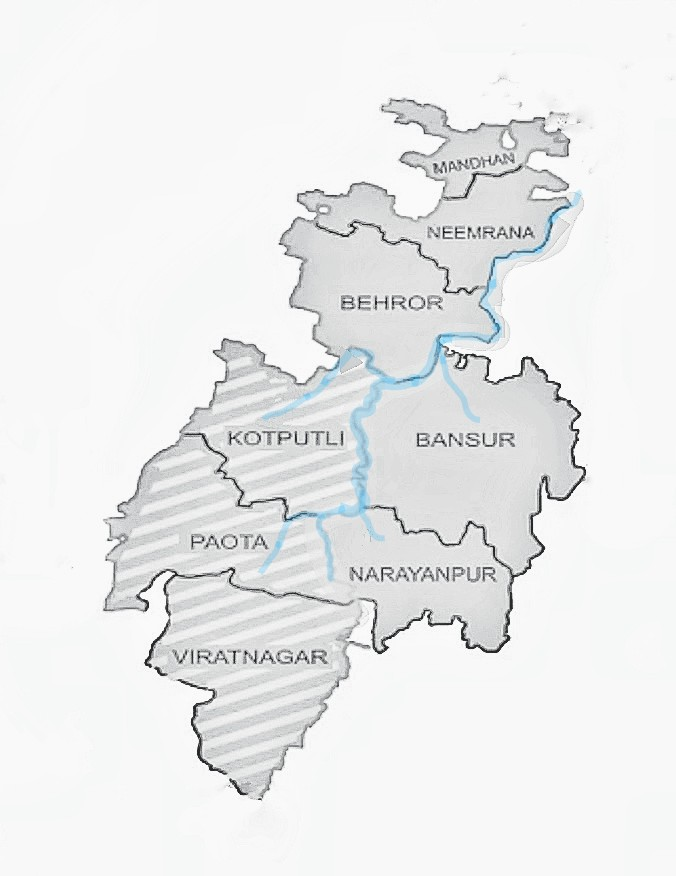
Map of Kot Behror District

- Kotpulti
- Behror
- Neemrana
- Bansur
- Viratnagar
- Paota
- Narayanpur
- Mandhan

== Toponym ==
The name of the district has been derived from merging the names of two of the most important cities of the district, Kotputli and Behror.

== Geography ==
=== Topography ===
Located on the northernmost fringe of the Aravalli range, this district is primarily composed of fertile plains with numerous Aravalli hillocks interspersed and is traversed by the Sahibi River throughout its length. The Aravalli hills form the natural boundaries of the district, geographically distinct from the rest of Rajasthan. These hills surround the district on three sides, except to the north towards Delhi.

On the southern side, the Aravalli hillocks mark the boundary with Shahpura of Jaipur District. Furthermore, a series of parallel limestone or sandstone hills form a barrier between the Bansur Tehsil of this district and Alwar District.

To the southeast, the Sariska Tiger Reserve is located, separated by the same limestone chains of the Aravalli Hills. In the northwest, the spread of the Thar Desert is prevented by chains of Aravalli Hills, which prevent its encroachment on the fertile plains.

The district faces water scarcity due to limited surface water resources, the degradation of the catchment area of the Sahibi River especially Aravalli Hills, and excessive use of groundwater resources. These factors contribute to the overall water stress in the region.

=== Climate ===
Climate is mostly dry deciduous with rainfall concentrated in months of September to October. Summers are long, hot and dry with frequent hot winds called 'lu'. In winters temperatures may drop to freezing point.

=== Rivers and dams ===
Sahibi or Sabi originating from the Aravalli hills spanning boundary of district with Sikar and Jaipur is the main and largest river of the district. It is 300 km long, an ephemeral, rain-fed river flowing towards Haryana and Delhi and drains into Yamuna in Delhi. There are no major surface water bodies like lakes except Buchara dam on Sota river and Babariya bund. Sota river is another major river which is a tributary and drains in the Sahibi river near Sotanala of Behror Tehsil. Narayanpur Nala carries the drainage of north-west of Bansur Tehsil and drains into Sahibi. Surakh Nala from babariya bund in Bansur drains into Sahibi at Sodawas Hajipur or Harsora Nala from Bansur drains into Sahibi at Bijwar in Mundawar tehsil of Khairthal district.

Ajabgarh Nala or Kali Nadi and Partabgarh Nala originate in Bansur and Thanagazi and morph into Banganga stream near Baldeogarh in Jaipur.

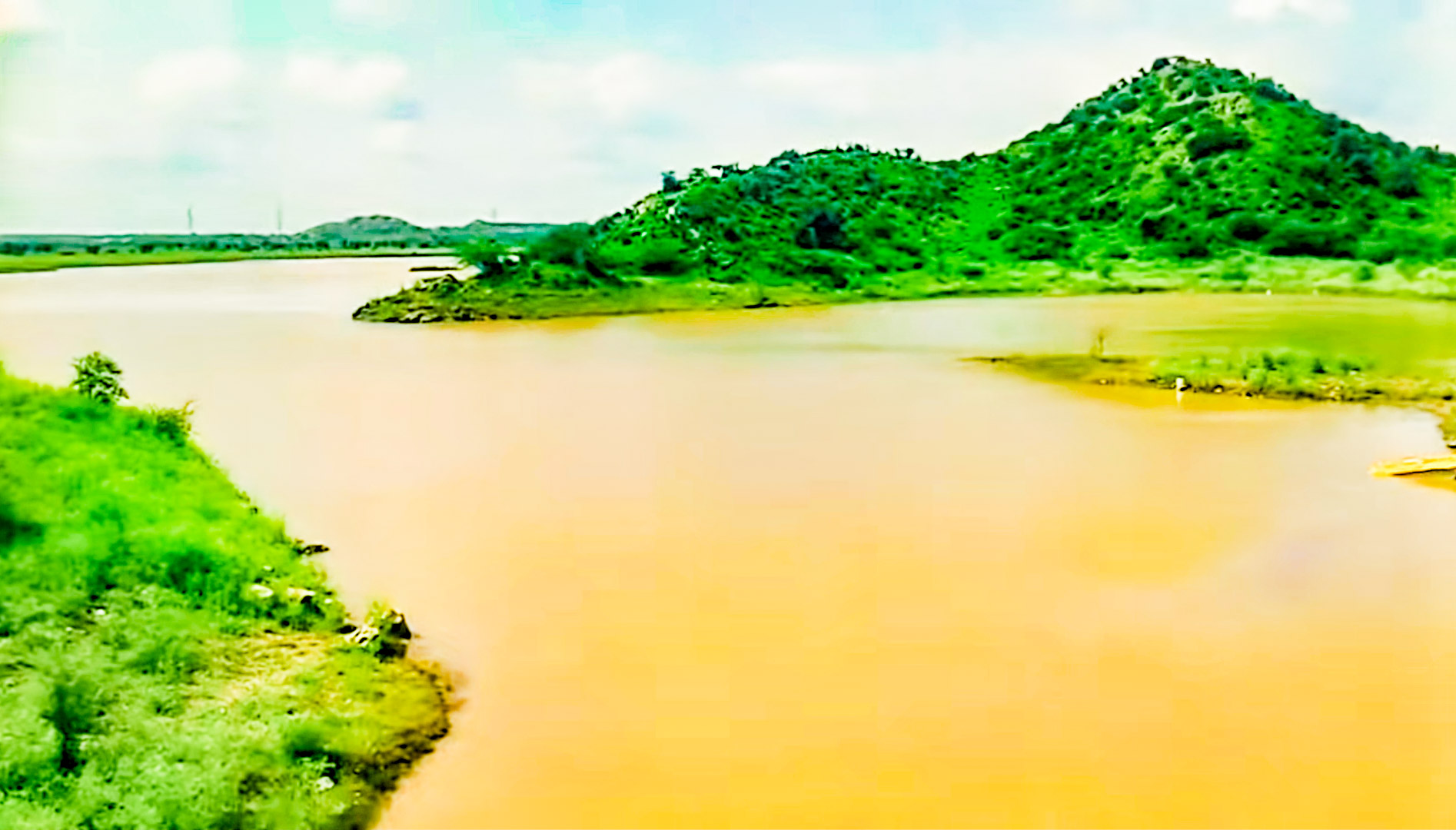
Buchara Dam on Sota River Near Paota in Kot Behror district

=== Springs ===
A hotwater spring rises in Talvriksh near Bansur Tehsil. There are a few cold water springs too.

Major tree species found are Neem, Dhak, Kikar and Khejri. Lemongrass is found abundantly along the banks of Sabi and Sota rivers. Major wild animal species are Nilgai, Leopard, Tiger, Jackal and Hyena. The district is rich in Quartz and Granite minerals, though they are mostly found in ecologically sensitive Aravalli ranges.

== History ==
In excavations in and around the Sahibi river basin, late Harrapan period archaeological evidence has been found.

The district is part of the wider Matsya Cultural Zone. Viratnagar tehsil of the district finds mention in ancient Indian texts as the capital of Matsya Kingdom, the town is said to have been founded by King Kirata where Pandavas spent their 12 years of exile in disguise. Oldest evidence of Buddhist Shrine in Circular pattern has been found in Viratnagar of the district. This region was part of Mauryan empire and name of King Ashoka as Piyadasi was mentioned in the Bhabru Rock edicts where he refers to himself as 'Piyadasi, Raja Magdhe' meaning Piyadasi, the king of Magadha. Besides numerous Indo-Greek coins have been excavated in and around Viratnagar, indicating it to be a flourishing trade town and evidence of Indo-Greek rule here.

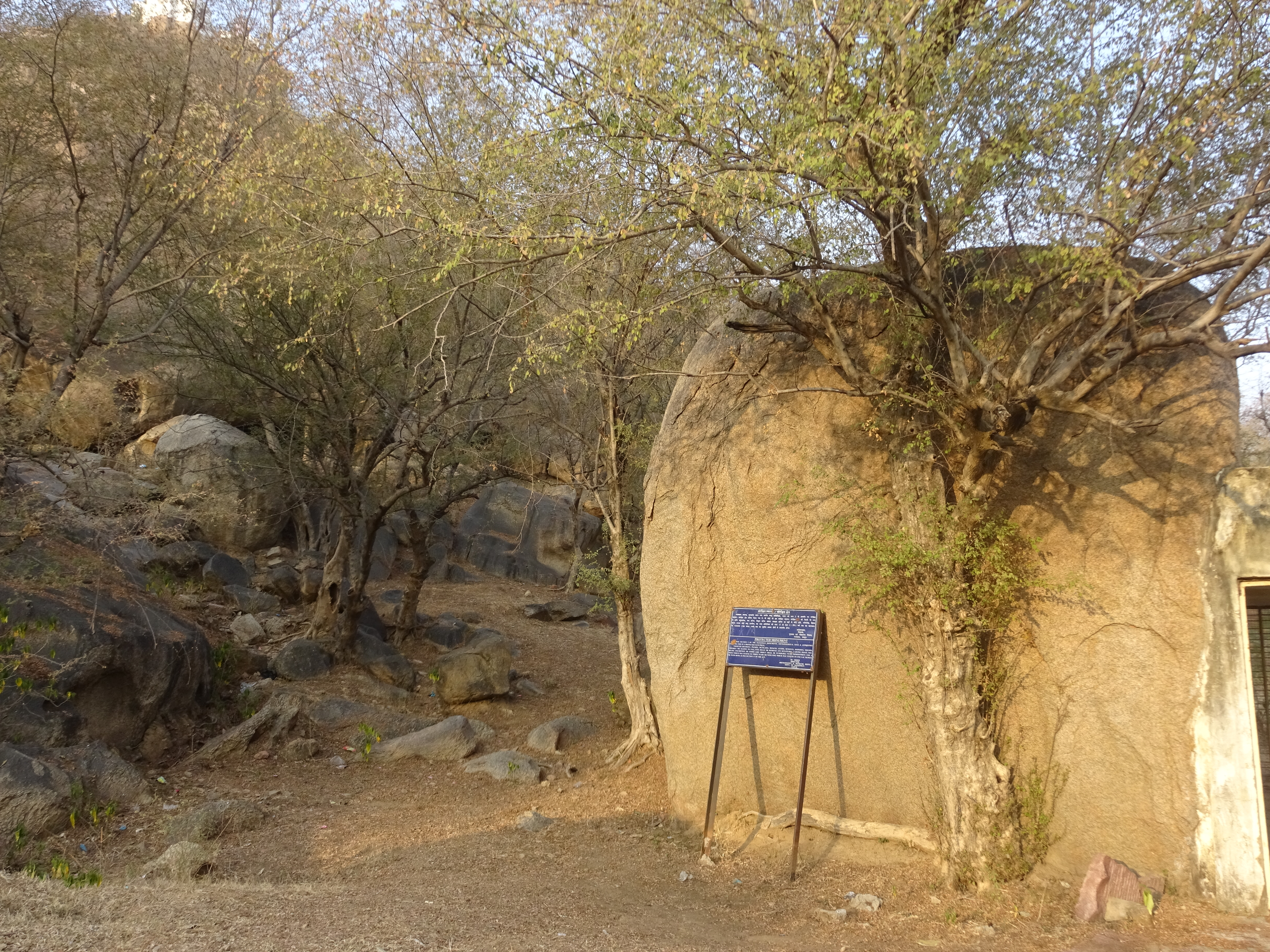
Ashok Rock Edict Viratnagar

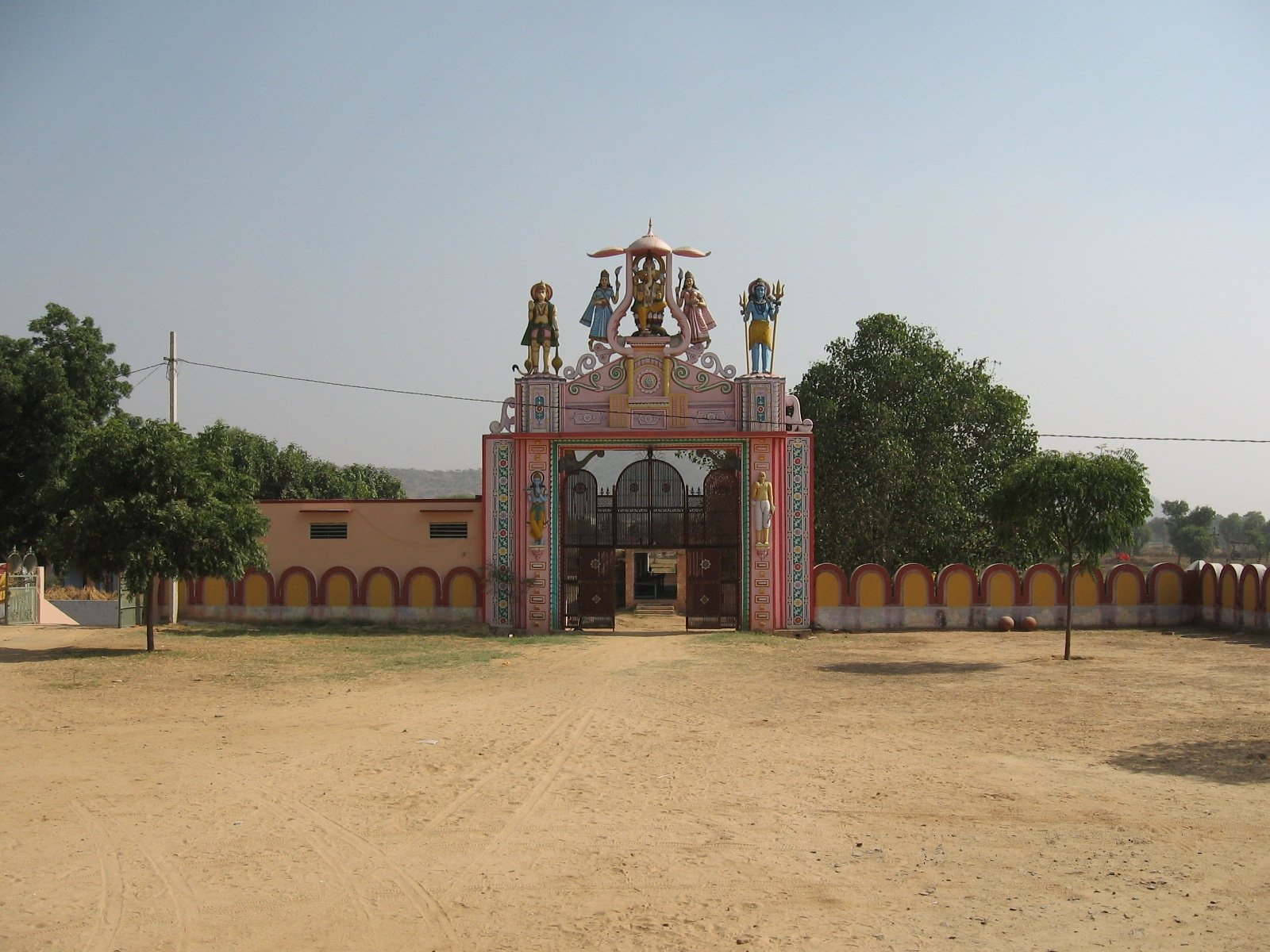
Baba Khetanath Temple Entry gate.

In 1009 AD, Narayanpur tehsil, then a state and ruled by King, was attacked by the Mahmud of Ghazni. The state was defeated, and town plundered to ruins, temples destroyed. The town then located near the limestone hills was established faraway again and now is the headquarters of the eponymous Narayanpur Tehsil of the district. Meanwhile, Tomars and Chouhan were the two rising power centres in the wider region. Then majority of the northern parts of the district were under the rule of Bhadanka empire. In the years following 1150 AD, this empire was defeated by Prithviraj Chouhan, but their hold was again made weak by their defeat in 1192 AD in the battle of Tarain, and after the loss of Delhi, their descendants spread out in the region called Rath of the district – chief among them Neemrana, Mundawar. This region came under the rule of the Sultans of Delhi and was ruled under Narnaul Suba with the governor situate in Narnaul.

Chieftainships

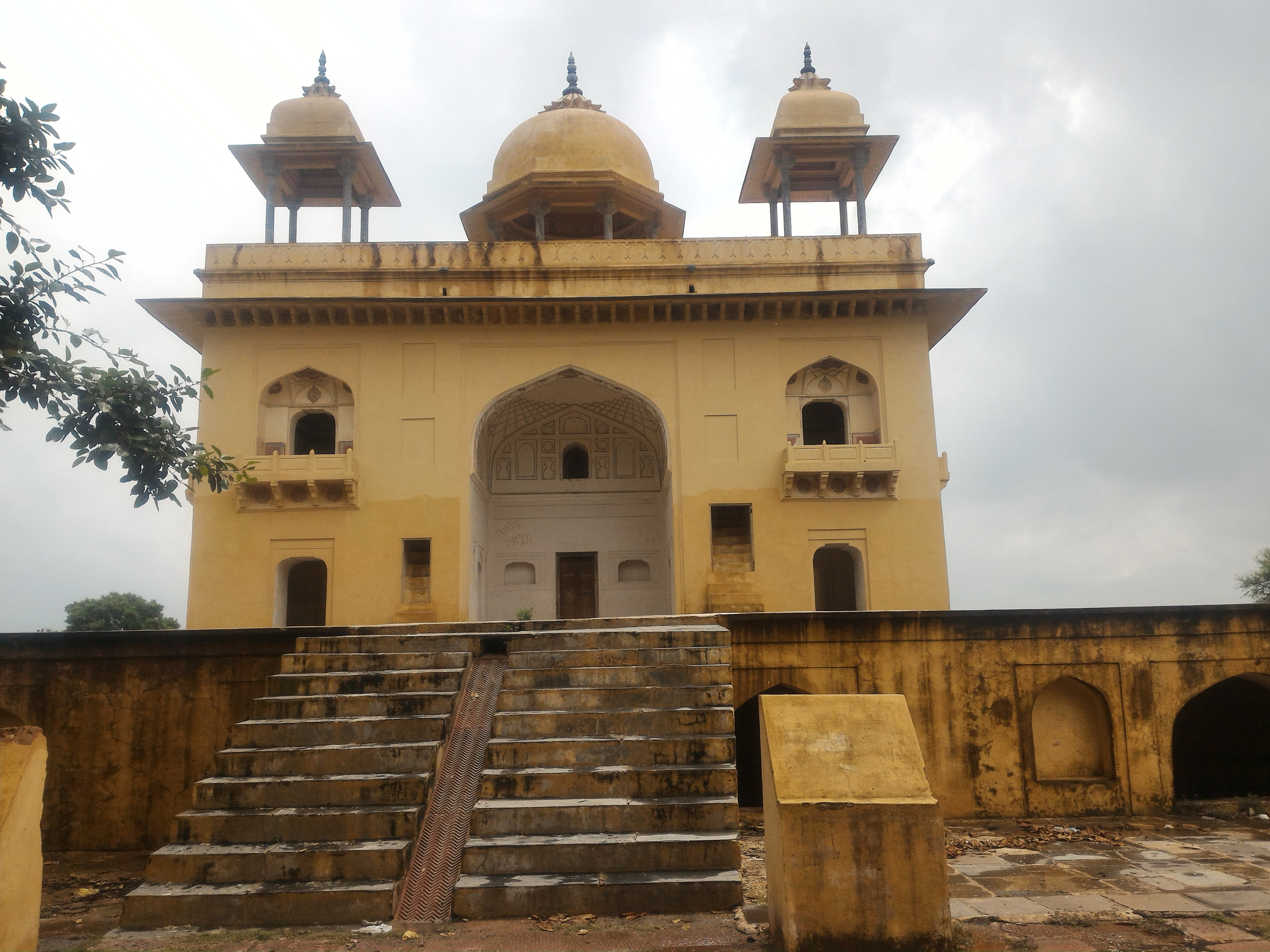
Mughal Gate Viratnagar

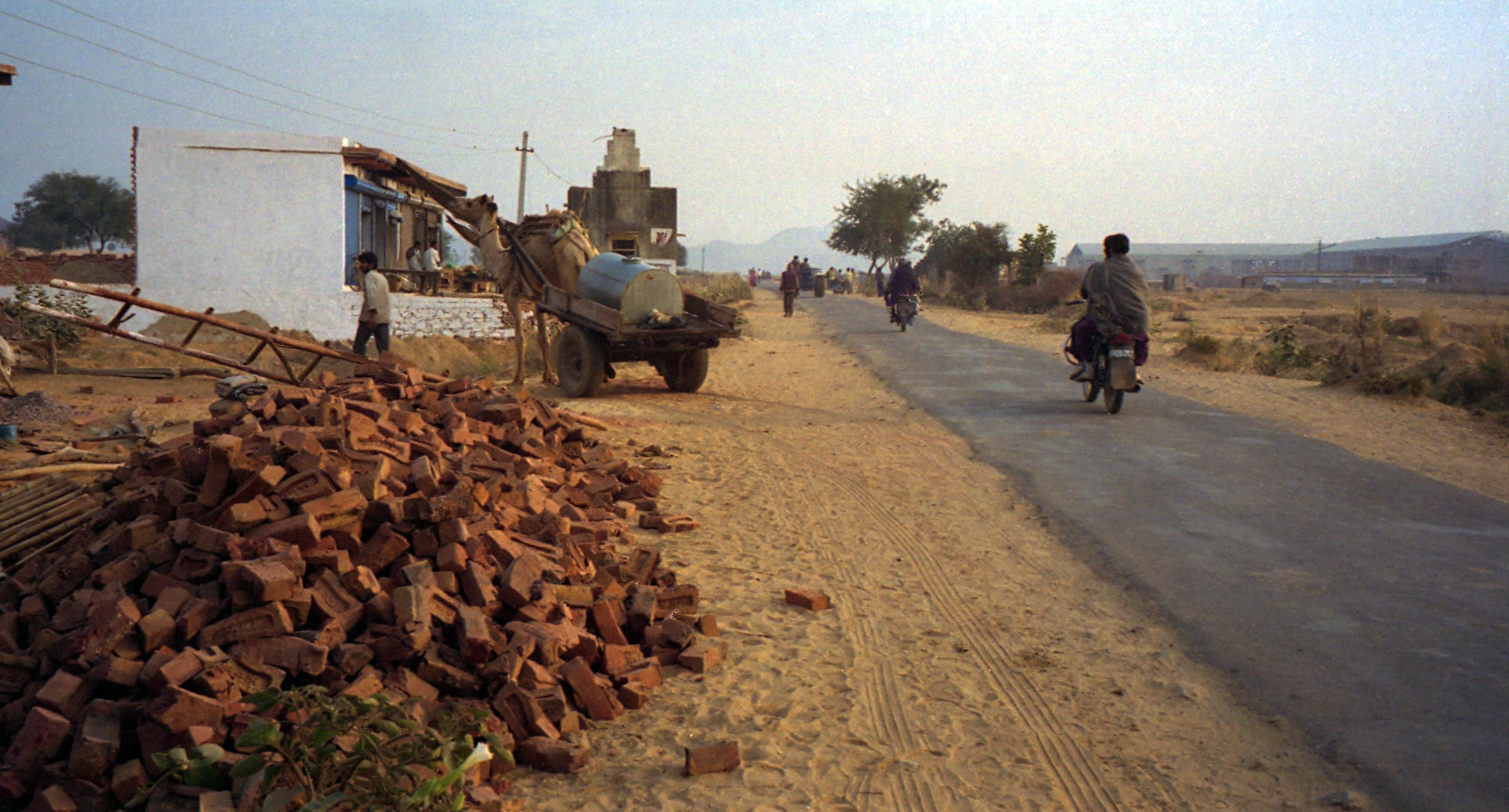
Neemrana in 1990s

In the subsequent tumultuous years Madan Singh, commonly known as Rao Made Chauhan, founded the village of Madanpur which is now known as Mundawar. Over time Barod was also acquired by his descendants. Firoz Shah forced Rao Jhama (son of Rao Hasa) to embrace Islam, but he preferred death. However, Rao Chand, son of Rao Jhama, is said to have converted to Islam in Samvat 1499 (AD 1442). After this Rajdev who was Rao Chand's uncle left Mundawar as a protest and chose Neemrana as his capital. The descendants of Rao Chand extended their hold till Bansur. But he was expelled from Bansur by the Shekhawats (of whom Rao Shekha, Rao Suja and Rao Jagmal were the most important) in Samvat 1560 (AD 1503). Rao Suja made Basai his capital while Jagmal established himself at Hajipur. After Suja's death in Samvat 1594 (AD 1537), his sons Rao Lunkaran, Gopal, Raisal, Chanda and Bheru extended their authority to Khetri, Sikar, Khandela and Shahpura. After Aurangzeb's death, internal differences encouraged smaller chieftains to seize power. Maharaja Surajmal of Bharatpur conquered the Alwar fort and some nearby area. But his son Jawahar Singh was defeated by the Jaipur ruler in the battle of Monda-Mandoli and lost the territory gained by his father. The Marathas captured Tijara and Kishangarh. In 1775, Pratap Singh of the Naruka family acquired the Alwar fort and established the Alwar State. And thus a major part of the district became part of Alwar State.

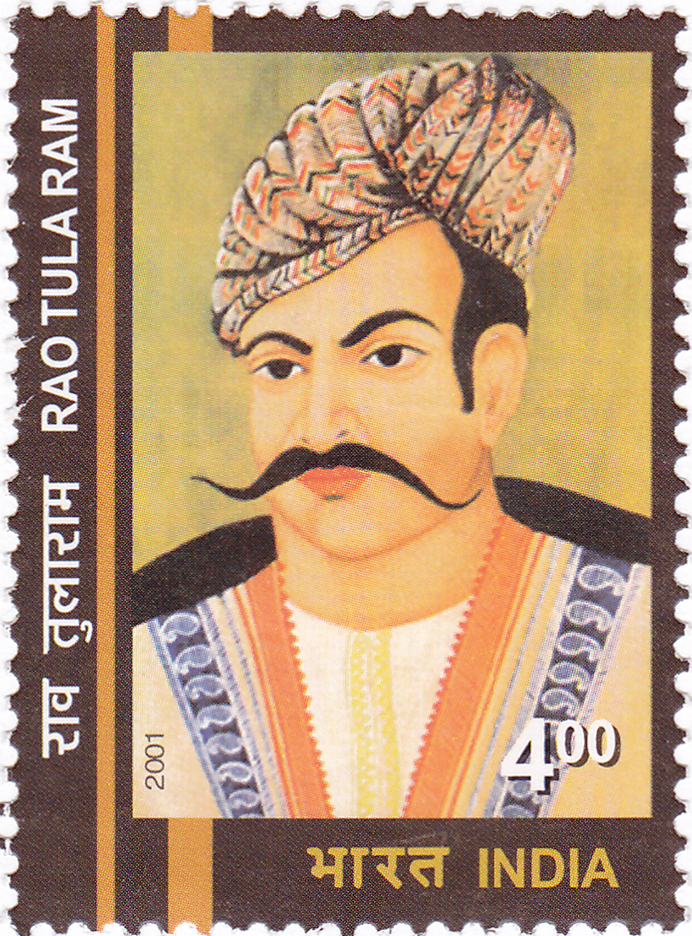
Rao Tula Ram

Before British rule it has been ruled by Sultans, Mughals, Marathas and finally by Alwar Princely state, while a part of the district Kotputli Tehsil was under the rule of Khetri Princely state. Rao Tula ram raised the local population of Ahirs against the British rule. After independence in 1947, it became part of Alwar state and was subsequently merged in the Rajputana state.

Neemuchana Massacre

It is called Jallianwala of Rajasthan. Bansur's landlords (Biswedars) revolted against the increase in tax by the Alwar king, which was brutally crushed, it is known as the Neemuchana massacre. On 13 May 1925, the Alwar state army and British army surrounded the Neemuchana village from all sides and asked the agitating Rajput farmers to end the movement. On the morning of May 14, the army closed all the roads and started firing indiscriminately with machine guns on the village without any warning. They burnt the village to ashes. As per the government figures of Alwar state, 156 farmers were killed and more than 600 were injured in this massacre. This was the second biggest massacre after the Jallianwala Bagh tragedy. No other farmer protest in the history of India before Neemuchana has led to the killing of so many people in a single day. According to the official government records, 156 died, while the non-official figures have claimed a horrific death toll of 1500 innocent people.This led to a strong reaction across the country at that time. Mahatma Gandhi described this massacre as ‘more vicious than Jallianwala Bagh’ incident. The Alwar court was forced to withdraw its decision and had to pay compensation to the next of kin after this.

=== Creation of new district ===
There has been long pending demand for the districts in the areas of Kotputli and Behror because of varied grievances, chief among them distance from present district headquarters.

Reasons were given that the distance of the present district is 60 km from Behror and 80 km from Neemrana and 100 km from Kotpulti.

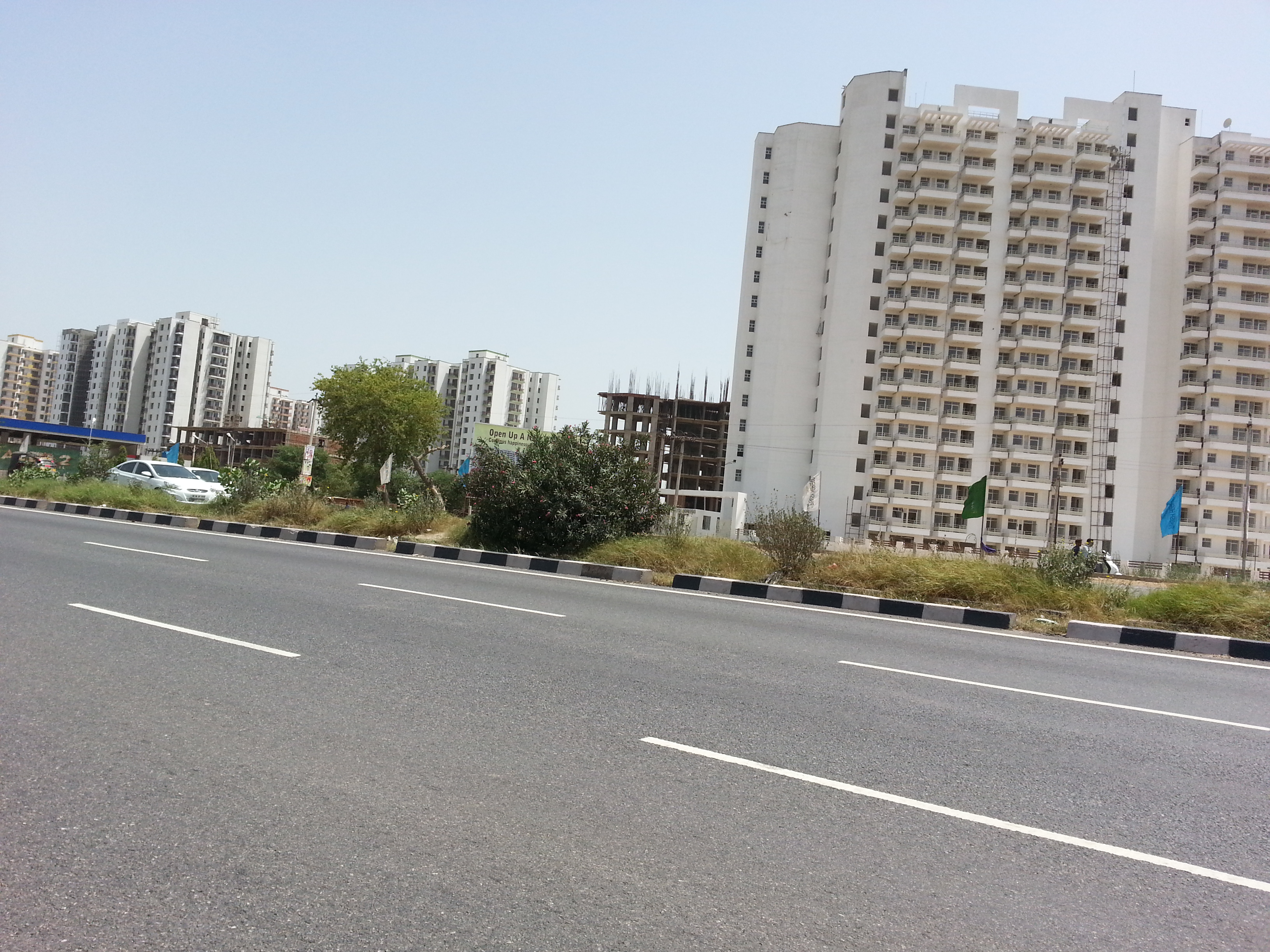
Under construction residential Buildings, NH48

During Budget of 2023 Rajasthan Legislative assembly created new 19 districts one of which was Kotptuli-Behror (Rath) district.

== Economy ==
Agriculture contributes to major part of GDP of the district followed by manufacturing.

=== Industry ===
Due to its proximity to capitals and good connectivity there are many government developed industrial areas in the district. Chief among them are Neemrana RIICO, Neemrana Japanese SEZ, Behror RIICO, Shahjahanpur RIICO, Sotanala RIICO, Keshwana RIICO. Behror RIICO is the oldest manufacturing cluster in district. In Neemrana Japanese Zone, EPIP Zone are present which contributes most to the GDP of the district. Neemrana has 1500 small and big industries including Daikin AC, Havells, Hero Bike Plant, Parle-G Biscuit, Richlite Biscuit. In Behror Greenlam Plywood is major manufacturing unit. Others are Barmalt in Keshwana. In Kotputli Aditya Birla Group's UltraTech Cement has a big Cement manufacturing and processing unit. According to Census of India 2011, three most important commodities manufactured in towns and cities were reported to be as following - Cement Production, Granite Tiles, Sunmica in Behror; Cotton Yarn, Electric Wire in Neemrana; Wooden Furniture, Textiles, Mustard Oil in Shahjahanpur; Vanaspati Ghee, Mustard Oil, Grain Products in Kotputli; Leather Shoes (mojadis) in Viratnagar respectively, though these have changed rapidly in recent years.

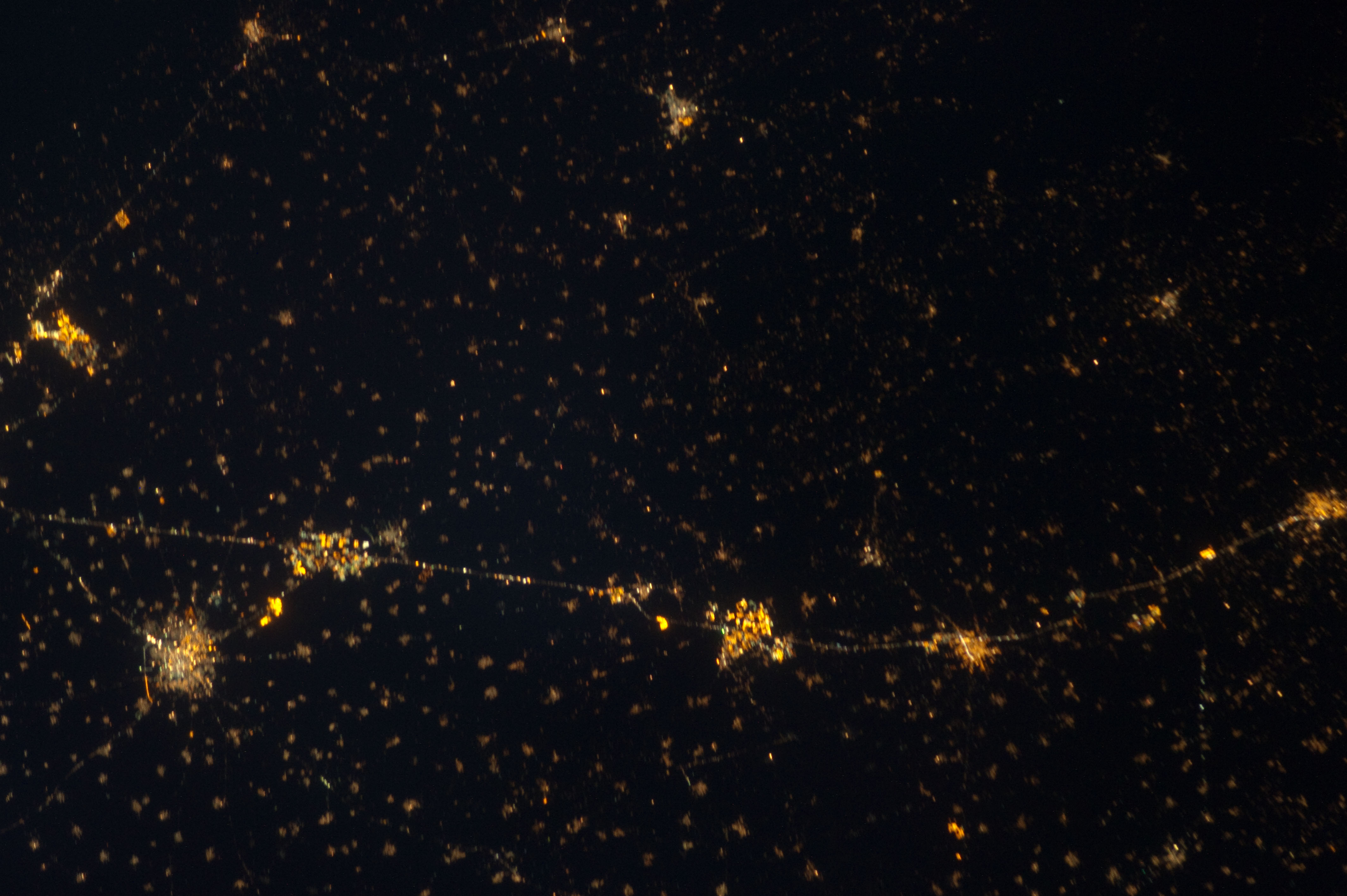
Image taken from ISS at night of areas surrounding Behror with NH 48 Visible

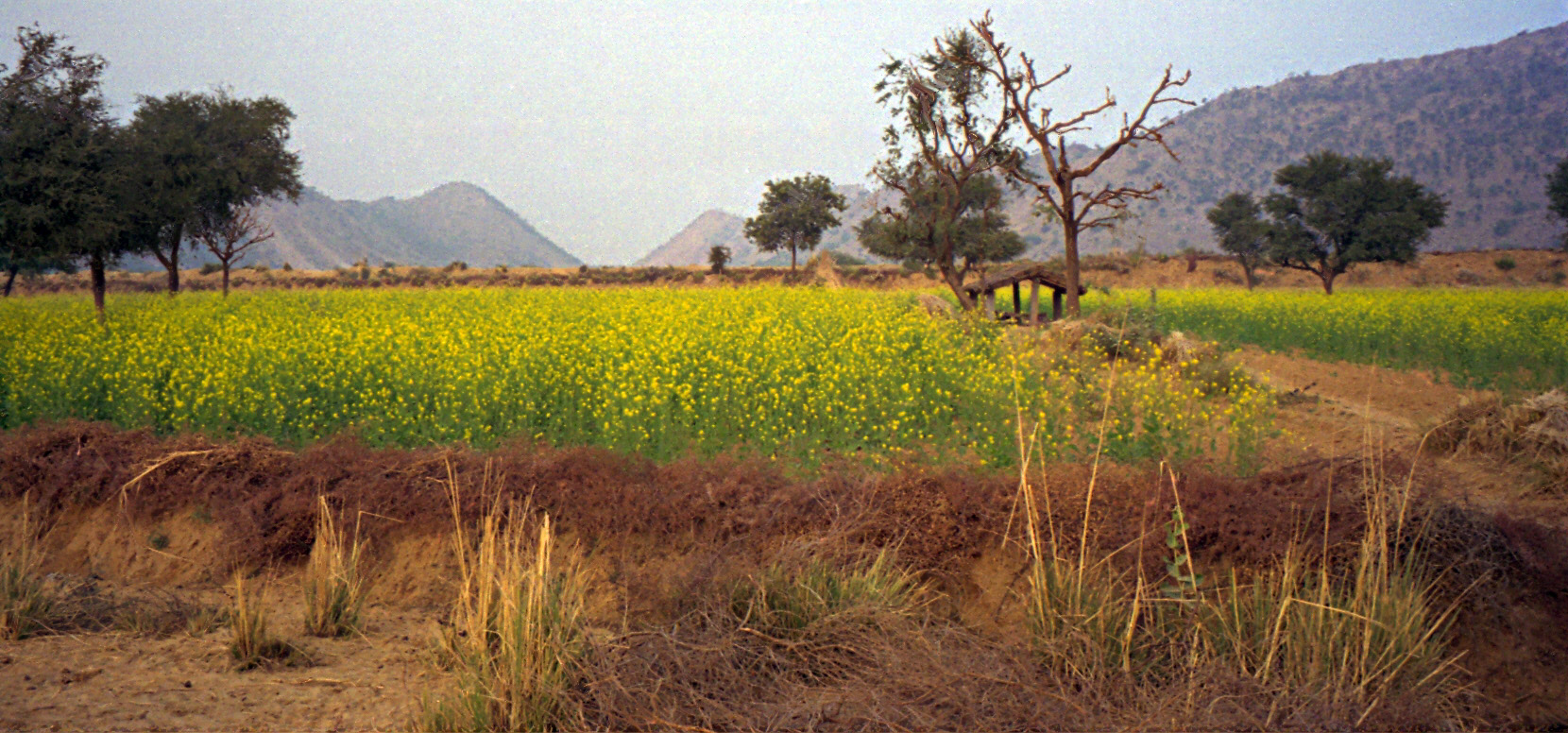
1996, Plains of Kot Behror district

Black Marble

This variety of Marble black in color is mined in Bhainslana village and is also called Bhainslana Marble. It has been used in the new parliament building of India and is also used to make figures of deities.

=== Agriculture ===
Behror-Neemrana is leading in the production of mustard and wheat. Apart from this, it also plays an important role in the production of cotton. There is a Mandi in Kotputli And Behror.

Jakharana Goat

This breed of goat originally from Jakhrana village of Behror near Haryana Boundary is a famous milch breed .

== Places of interest ==
=== Viratnagar Stupas ===
Located on Bijak Ki Pahari these buddhist complexes are the testimony to regions culturally rich past. They were built during the time of Ashoka in the 3rd century BCE, and near them were found two of Ashoka's Minor Rock Edicts, the Bairat and the Calcutta-Bairat Minor Rock Edicts. It is the earliest circular Buddhist shrine and therefore, Bairat temple is an important marker of the architecture of India.

=== Neemrana Fort ===
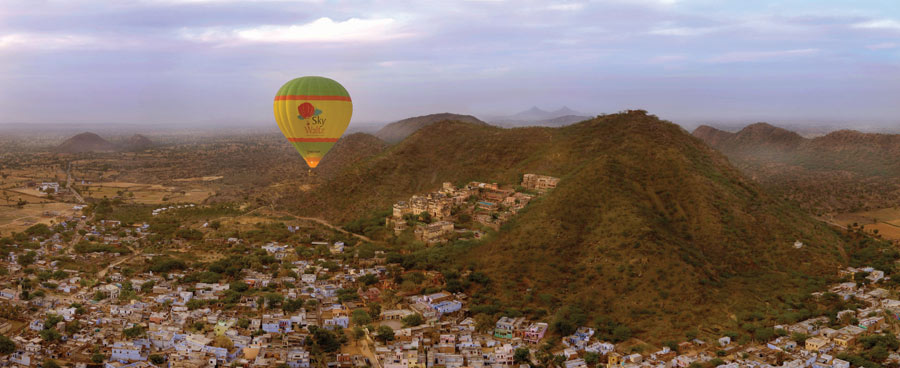
Neemrana fort

Neemrana Fort Complex in the Neemarna Tehsil is the most important Landmark. The famous Neemrana fort was built in the 16th century and was occupied by Chouhans claiming to be descendants of Prithviraj of Ajmer till 1947.

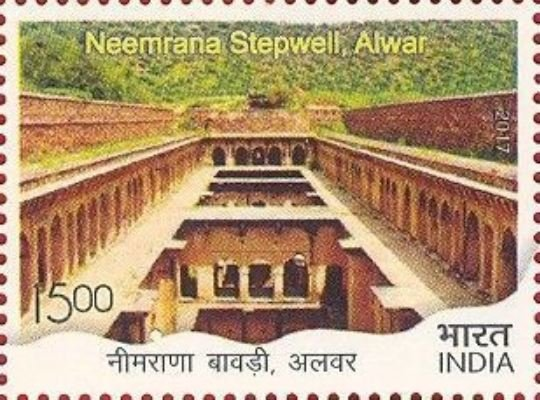
Stamp of India - 2017 - Colnect 759987 - Neemrana Stepwell

=== Neemrana Baori ===
Historical stepwell in Neemrana . Each floor having a height of about 20 feet, and 9 floors making up the entire structure with 86 colonnaded openings at the ground level from where the visitors used 170 steps to access the water pool deep down below the ground. It was built by Raja Todarmal.

=== Bansur Fort ===
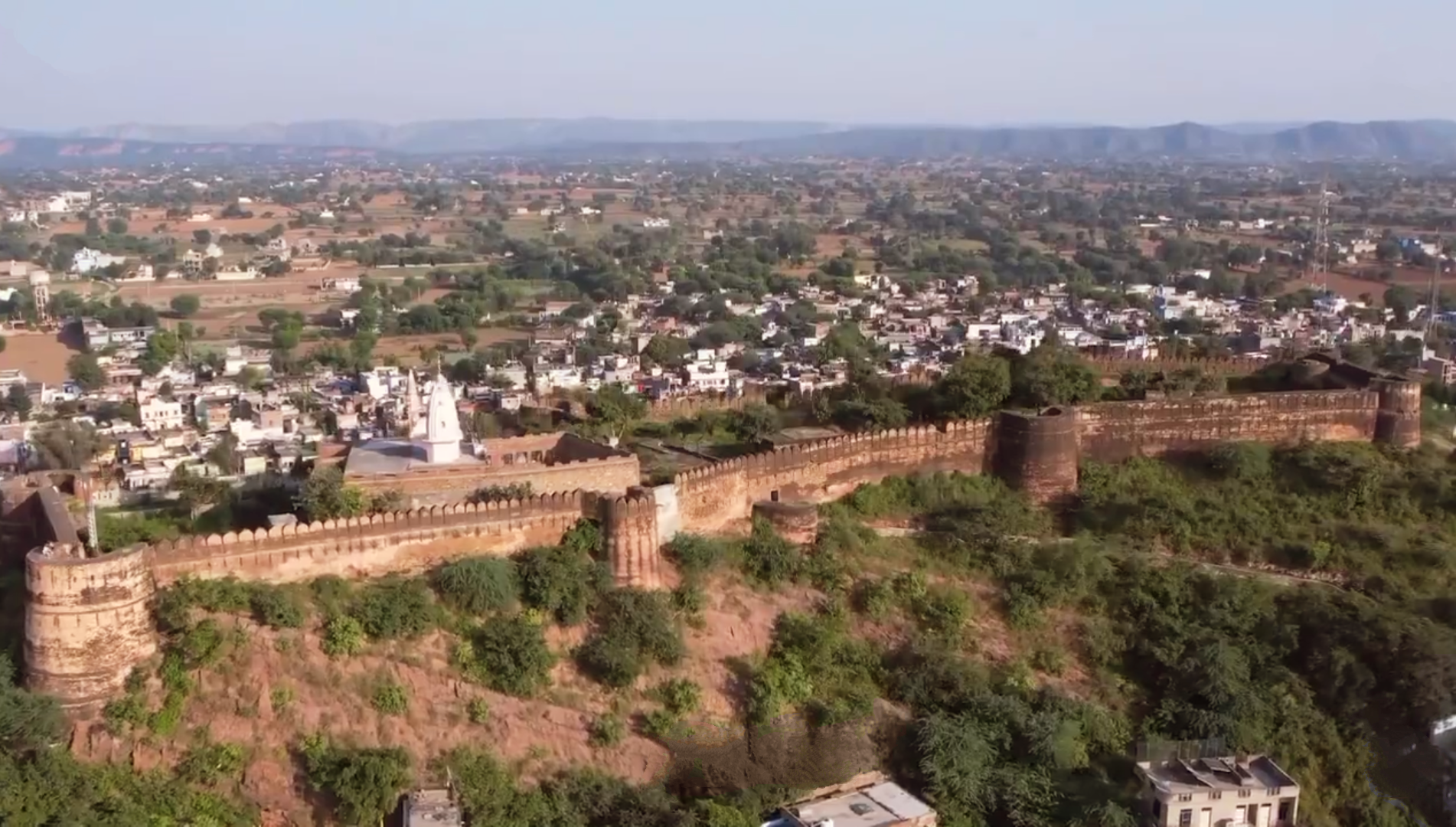
Bansur Fort

The structure of the fort situated on a small hillock in the middle of the town is multi-angular. From a strategic point of view, the fort was built from the late 16th century to the first half of the 17th century.

Formerly the princely state of Alwar was under Bharatpur. In such a situation, due to mutual estrangement and fear of war between the princely state of Jaipur and Bharatpur, the border between Jaipur and Alwar was Bansur. This fort has been a sentinel of the border of Alwar region.

=== Taseeng Fort ===
Taseeng Fort located in Aravali hills 5 km away from Behror headquarters. Taseeng Fort is 450 years old and place of attraction & Heritage. It is a property of Badgujar ( Raghav ) Rajput Clan, Present Head Thakur Mohan Singh Raghav ( Former Additional Advocate General ) his wife Sada Kanwar was the Sister of Former Vice President of India & Former Chief Minister of Rajasthan Late Shri Bhairon Singh Shekhawat.[

=== Bhabru Rock Edicts ===
Emperor Ashoka was mentioned as Priyadarshi in these Rock Edicts. These are minor rock edicts found near Bhabru hills, now located in Museum of Asiatic Society Kolkata. The edict was discovered by Captain Burt in 1840, and transferred to the Museum of the Asiatic Society of Bengal at Calcutta, hence the name "Calcutta-Bairat", also called the Bhabra or Bhabru Edict . In this inscription, Ashoka is referred to as "Piyadasi Raja Magadhe" ("Piyadasi, king of Magadha")

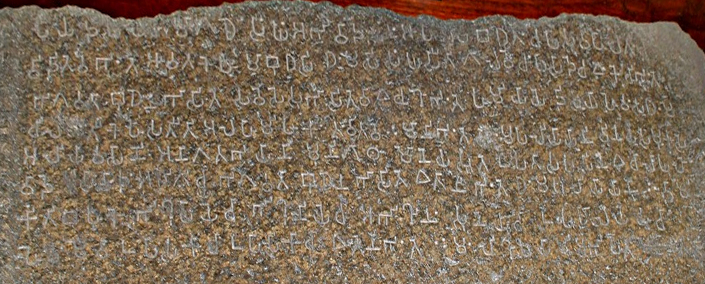
Bhabru Minor Rock edict #3 of Emperor Ashoka in Kot Behror district

=== Buchara Dam ===
It is located on Sota river which is a tributary of Sabi river. It has a filling height of around 35 feet. It was built in the year 1889 by the King of Jaipur.

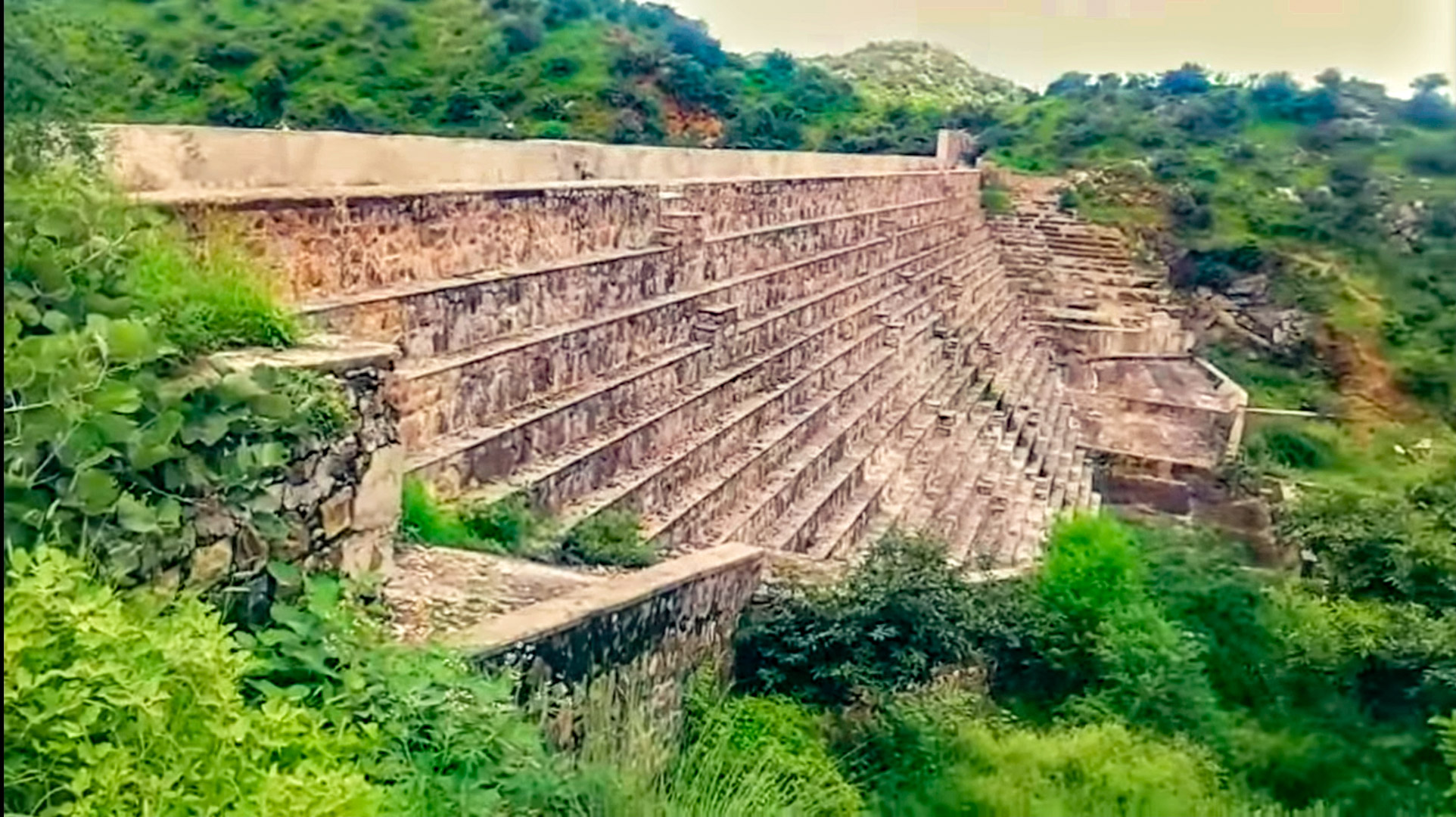
Buchara Dam Embankment on Sota River Near Paota in Kot Behror district

=== Mansa Mata Temple ===
Mansa Devi Temple in Dahmi is thronged by devotees far and wide during Navratris . It is 637-year-old temple.

=== Baba Khetanath Temple ===
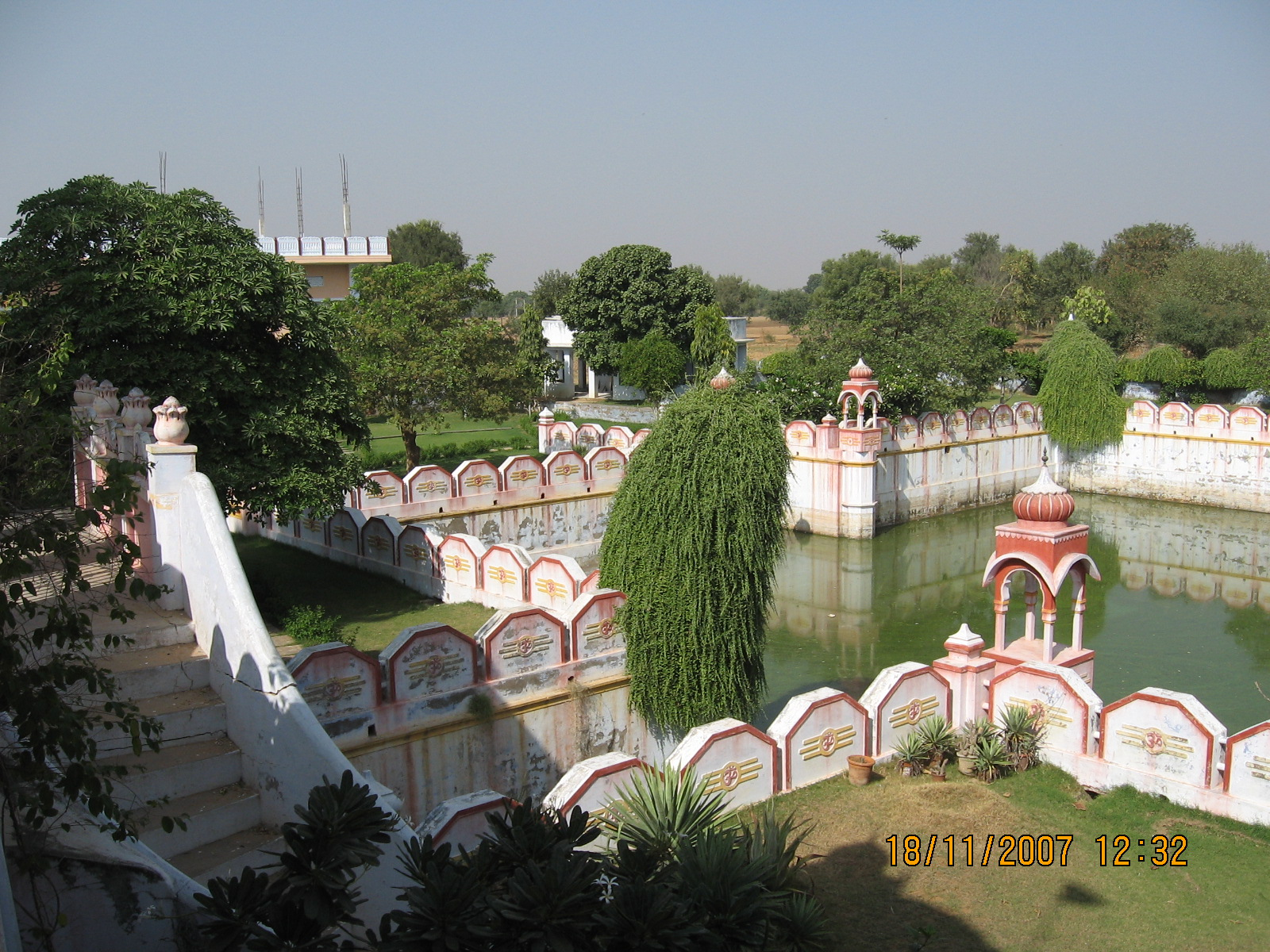
Internal Garden at Baba Khetanath Aashram, Neemrana

It is located in Joshihera, Neemrana.

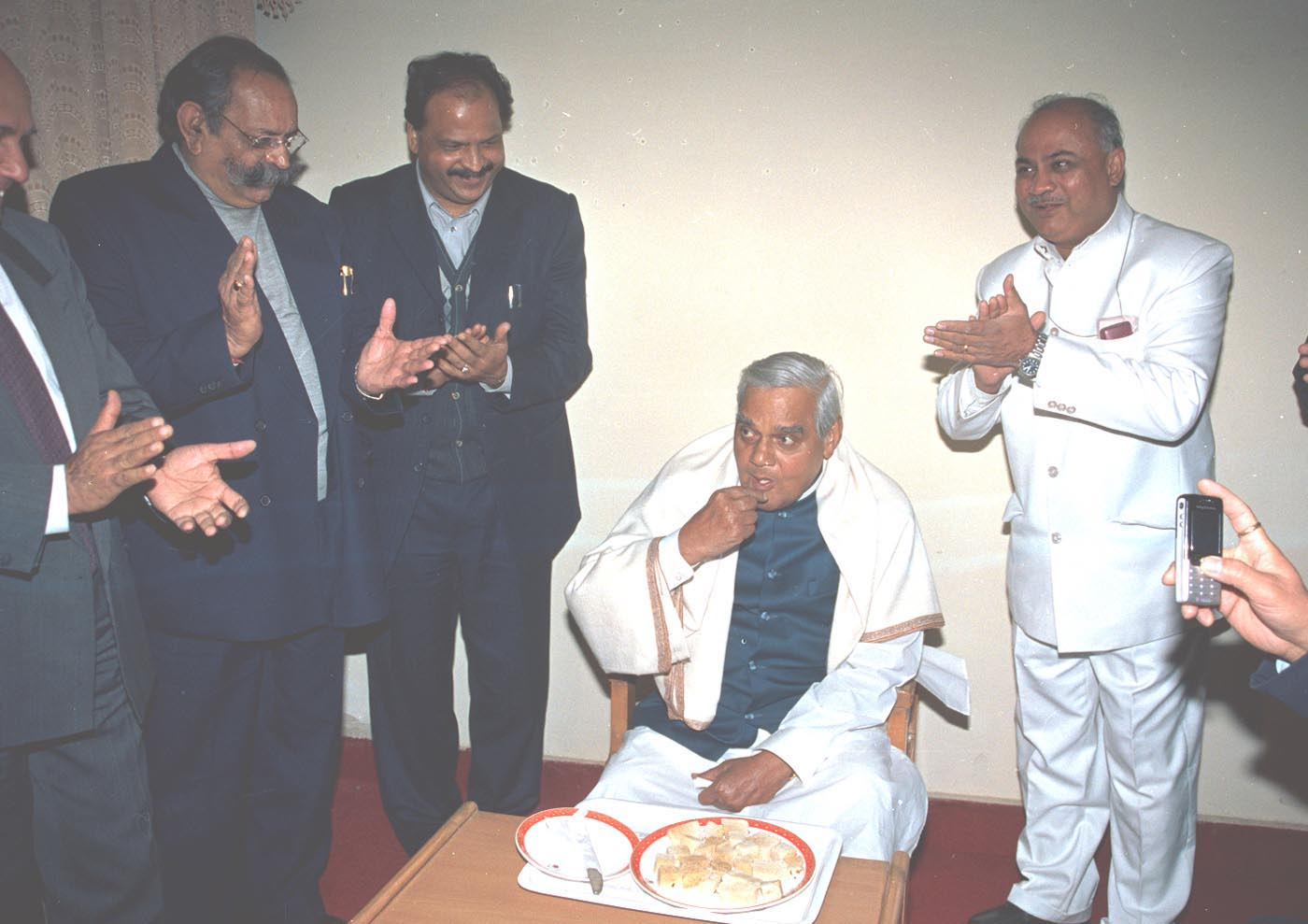
Prime Minister Shri Atal Bihari Vajpayee celebrating his 79th birthday at RTDC Midway Behror.

=== Saroond Mata Temple ===
It is an ancient devi temple located on the banks of Sota River atop a hillock, in Saroond Village on Kotputli NeemkaThana Highway.

=== Hanuman Temple Rundh Bardod ===
Situated near Barrod of Behror, this temple is in a sacred grove.

=== RTDC Midway ===
RTDC Midway Behror is an important public hotel and landmark situated midway between Delhi and Jaipur on NH-8 Where leaders of different states and of different countries, former Prime Minister Atal Bihari Vajpayee, administrative officers and judicial officers, besides foreign ambassadors have tasted Rajasthani flavors. Prime Minister Atal Bihari Vajpayee celebrated his 79th birthday here.

=== Hajipur Fort ===
This fort was built under reign of Mughal Emperor Akbar to rein in the frequent attacks on Commercial convoys towards alwar by Bandits. It is located in Bansur Tehsil.

=== Bardod Rundh Palace ===
It was the hunting expedition residence of rulers of Alwar princely state and is in the Bardod Rundh.

=== Rundhs Of Kotputli-Behror district ===
Rundhs were the reserve forests under the Alwar Princely state used for Hunting by royals andas large grazing lands. There are many Rundhs in Kotputli-Behror district and enroachments are frequent. While Banis were smaller non-notified community forests.

=== Buchara Sanctuary ===
These forests have been notified as Leopard Sanctuary in the Rajasthan Budget 2023 . It is located in Kotputli/Paota Tehsils spread in an area of 50 km^{2}.

=== Rath Cattle Fair at Behror ===
For the improvement of the Rath breed in the district, the fair is organized at Behror. It is held every year in the month of May. A large number of persons congregate in the fair.

== Demographics ==
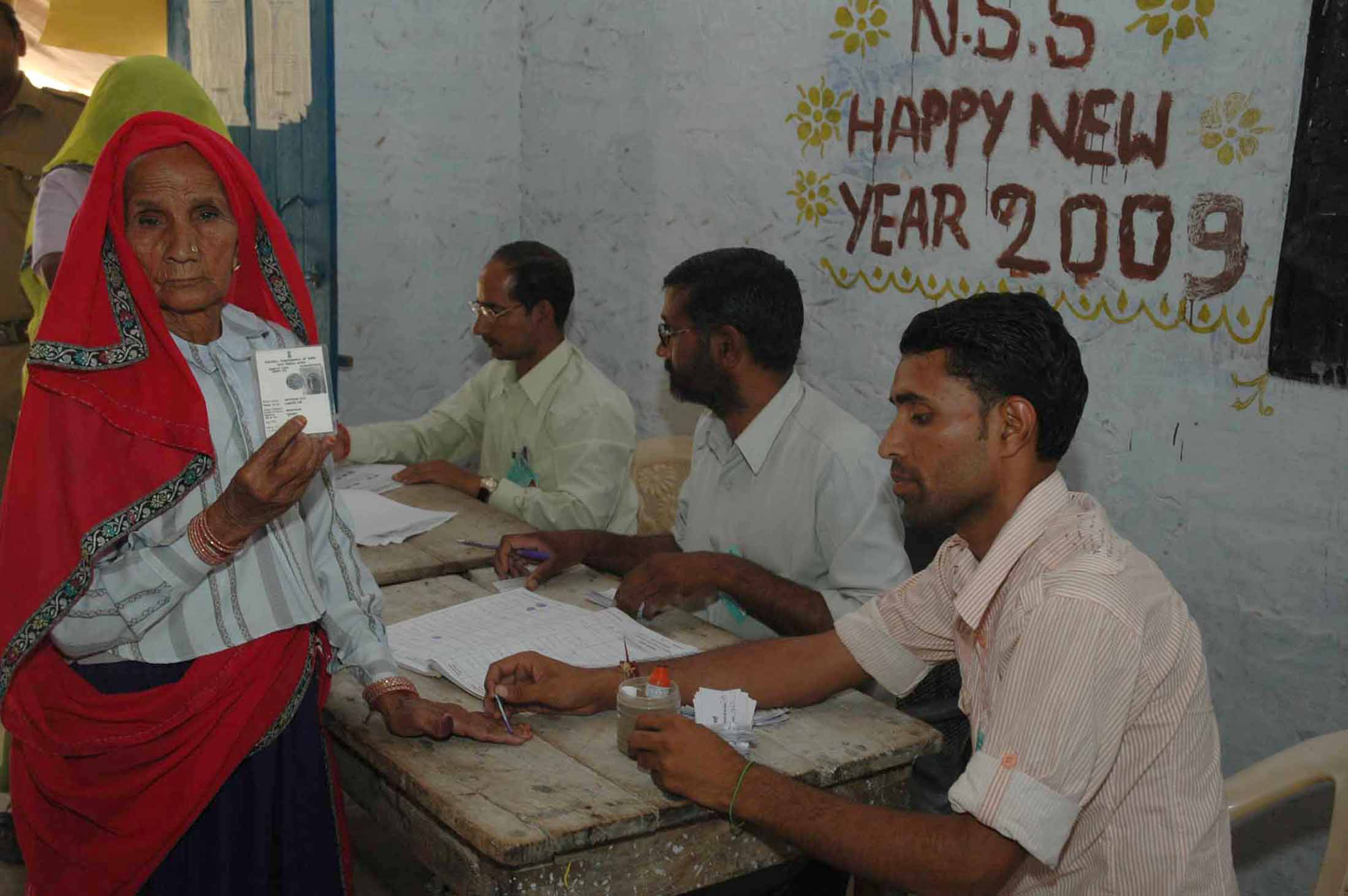
A typical elderly woman of Kotputli-Behror district

At the time of the 2011 census, Kotputli-Behror district had a population of 1,271,922. 116,281 (9.14%) lived in urban areas.

=== Religion ===
Religion in Kotuputli-Behror (2011)
Religion	Percent
Hinduism	98.50%
Islam	1.31%
Other or not stated	0.19%
Distribution of religions

Hinduism is the major religion with other religions mainly being Muslims.

=== Languages ===
Languages of Kotputli-Behror district (2011)
1. Hindi (93.2%)
2. Rajasthani (5.03%)
3. Others (1.82%)

Ahirwati is the most common language spoken in the major parts of the district. Hindi is the official language. It is influenced by Bangru the most, and seems rough to people not used to it.

== Transport ==
One of the busiest highways of the India NH-48 crisscrosses the district and connect both headquarters of the district, it also connects the district to state capital Jaipur and national capital New Delhi. Trans Haryana expressway (NH 152-D) connects the district headquarters to Chandigarh while Paniyala-Barodameo expressway which is under construction connects the district to Alwar district, Kairthal district and Delhi-Mumbai Expressway.

There is no railway line in the whole district except for a short strip in Kathuwas of Mandhan Tehsil. Nearest Railway Station is Narnaul on Rewari-Phulera line and Bawal on Rewari-Alwar railway line. Inland Container depot is located at Kathuwas on the Rewari-Phulera railway line.

Nearest International airports are Indira Gandhi International Airport and Jaipur International airport both at a distance of 120 km from Behror headquarters. Nearest domestic airstrip is Bachhod Airstrip at a distance of 25 km from Behror headquarters and 50 km from Kotputli headquarters.

== Institutions ==
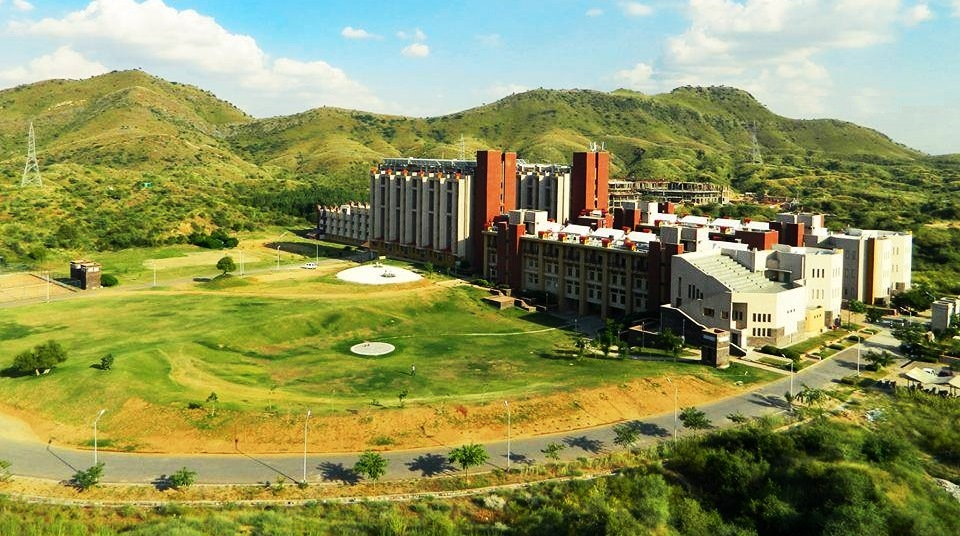
NIIT University Neemrana

=== Education ===
There are well known CBSE and RBSE schools. Raffles University, NIIT University, St. Margret Engineering College, Private and Government Women's College, Co-Education College, Many B.Ed. Colleges, LBS College are some of the higher education institutes in the district. There is no medical college in the district, nearest medical college is 120 km away. Rajasthan's first Integrated public health lab was established in PBDM hospital Kotputli with support of CDC On 22 June 2023.

CISF Training Centre

Maharana Pratap Regional Training Centre (MPRTC) of Central Industrial Security Force (CISF) is situated on Behror-Narnaul state highway in Behror. This institution was established in the year 2010 where basic training of new recruits and various in-service specialized courses are conducted.
