= Paota, Rajasthan =

Paota Paota
- Municipality
- Location in Rajasthan, India Paota (India)
- Coordinates: 27.3513°N 76.0422°E
- Country: India
- State: Rajasthan
- District: Kot Behror

Government
  - Type: Municipality
  - Body: Nagar Palika Paota
- Elevation: 744 m (2,441 ft)

Population (2001)
  - Total: 15,473

Languages
  - Official: Hindi, English
- Time zone: UTC+5:30 (IST)
- Postal code: 303106
- ISO 3166 code: RJ-IN
- Vehicle registration: RJ-32

Paota is a municipality and headquarter of eponymous Paota tehsil in Kotputli-Behror district 20 kilometres (12 mi) north of Jaipur and 170 kilometres (110 mi) southeast of Delhi on Highway NH-48 (Ajmer-Delhi Expressway) in Rajasthan state, India. Paota is famous for its extensive market and low cost products.

== Demographics ==
Paota became the tehsil after its request was recognised by the government of Rajasthan, which previously was the constitute of Viratnagar. Paota municipality serves along with Pragpura and now it is known as Paota-Pragpura Municipality with almost total 2522 families residing in it. As per the 2011 census, Paota town has a population of 15,473, of which 8119 are males while 7354 are females. In Paota town the population of children age 0-6 is 2315, which makes up 14.96% of the total population of the village.

== Education ==
Paota has a high literacy rate compared to rest of Rajasthan. In 2011, the literacy rate of Paota was 76.33% compared to 66.11% in Rajasthan. In Paota, male literacy stands at 87.54% while the female literacy rate is 64.04%.

== Caste Factor ==
Scheduled Castes (SC) constitute 17.19%, while Scheduled Tribes (ST) were 7.73% of the total population in Paota town.

== Work profile ==
Of the total population, 4995 were engaged in work activities. 91.61% of workers describe their work as main work (employment or earning more than 6 months) while 8.39% were involved in marginal activity providing livelihood for less than 6 months. Of 4995 workers engaged in main work, 1414 were cultivators (owner or co-owner) while 57 were agricultural labourers. 6.89% people work in government jobs; teaching and police and army services are most common.

== Cloth market ==
Paota's cloth market is famous for Rajasthani attire. The cloth market is filled with clothing from Indian attire to western clothes.

== Clothing ==
Older men wear dhoti, kurta, kacha and bandi as innerwear.

Married and older women wear lehnga and lugdi in rural areas; in urban areas women wear saris.

Younger girls wear western dresses as they are popular in India; in rural areas girls wear suits and salwar.

Young men wear western clothing as well as traditional kurta pajama.
