= Neemrana =

Historical town in Rajasthan, India

- Town
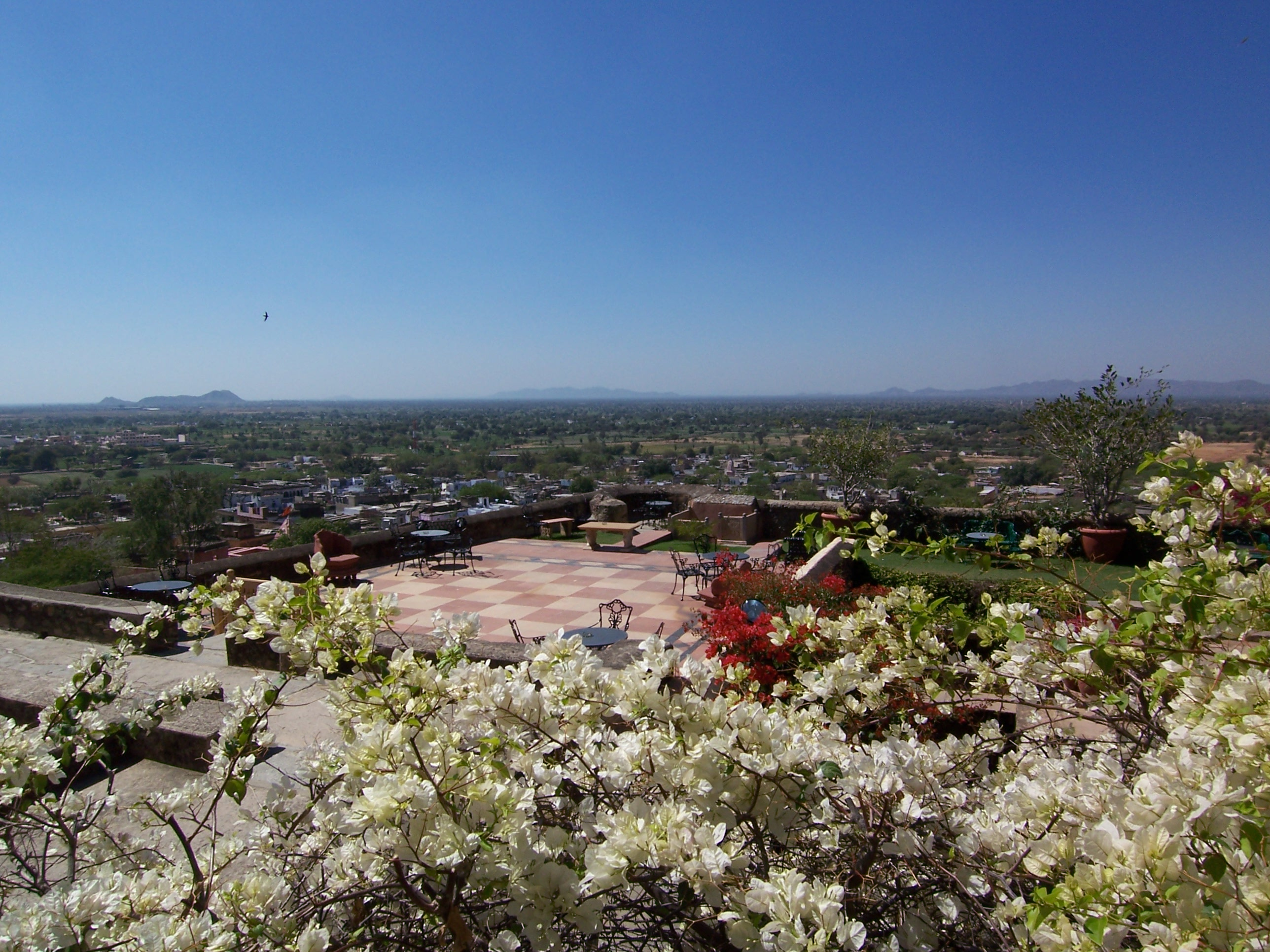
- Neemrana Fort Palace terrace and the town below in Rath Kshetra (RJ)

- Location in Rajasthan, India Neemrana (India)
- Coordinates: 27°59′20″N 76°23′18″E
- Country: India
- State: Rajasthan
- District: Kotputli-Behror district

Government
  - Type: Municipal Corporation
  - Body: Nagar Palika Neemrana

Languages
  - Official: Hindi, Ahirwati, Rajasthani
- Time zone: UTC+5:30 (IST)
- PIN: 301705
- Nearest city: Behror

Neemrana (/ niːmərɑːɳɑː / ) is an ancient historical town in Kotputli-Behror district in the Indian state of Rajasthan. It is 66 km (41 mi) from Alwar city, 117 km (73 mi) from New Delhi and 155 km (96 mi) from Jaipur, on the Delhi - Jaipur highway in Neemrana tehsil. It is between Behror and Shahajahanpur.

In May 2025, it was in news when a hotel in the town, Hotel Highway King, witnessed firing of shots and the case is being investigated by National Investigation Agency.

The Town has developed an industrial zone as part of the Delhi-Mumbai industrial corridor.
