= Kotputli =

Kotputli कोट
- City
- Kotputli tehsil in Kotputli, Rajasthan, India

- Location in Rajasthan, India
- Coordinates: 27.705479°N 76.190969°E
- Country: India
- State: Rajasthan
- District: Kotputli-Behror
- Tehsil: Kotputli

Population (2011)
  - Total: 49,202

Languages
  - Official: Hindi
- Time zone: UTC+5:30 (IST)
- PIN: 303108
- Telephone code: 01421
- Vehicle registration: RJ 32

Kotputli is a city and municipal council in Kotputli-Behror district of Rajasthan, India, located between Jaipur city and New Delhi.It is part of the Ahirwal region of Rajasthan. The district headquarters is Kotputli, and also has been part of wider Matsya-Bairath cultural space. Kotputli has many historic temples and schools Sardar School and Sardar Zanana Hospital were made by local bodies in conjunction with the Morijawala and Tijoriwala family. Since then, numerous schools and hospitals have been built in Kotputli .

== History ==
A municipality was established at Kotputli in 1962. Kotputli is now an new district of Rajasthan as Kotpuli-Behror.

== Organizations ==
Educational:Kotputli is home to many government and non-government higher education institutions, including NIMT Mahila B.Ed College (Offering B.Ed), NIMT Technical and Professional Colleges (Offering BA, BSc, BCom, LLB, BALLB), NIMT Institute of Management (Offering PGDM), Lal Bahadur Shastri Government PG College, Smt. Pannadevi Morijawala Government Girls College, Choudhary T.T College, Shri Krishna PG Law College, Tagore PG Law College, Hans Law College, Pristine Career Institute (for NEET & IIT-JEE), Bansur PG college and Behror PG college.

== Population ==
Kotputli town alone has a population of 18,202 as of the 2011 Census of India, with 10,051 males and 8,151 females. The population of Tehsil Kotputli according to the 2011 Census is 49,153 with 26,058 males and 23,094 females.

== Demographics ==
The population of Kotputli was 52.7% male and 47.3% female as of the 2011 census. When asked about religious preference, 97.6% of the region identified as Hindu and 2.0% as Muslim, with Christians, Sikhs, and Jains making up the remaining population. Kotputli has an average literacy rate of 60.6%, slightly higher than the national average of 59.5%; male literacy is 71.5%, and female literacy is 48.6%. 88.1% of the population lives in the city, while 11.9% live in rural areas. 15.5% of the population is under six years of age.

== Geography and climate ==
Kotputli has an average elevation of 439 meters (1,440 ft).

Climate data for Kotputli
| Month | Jan | Feb | Mar | Apr | May | Jun | Jul | Aug | Sep | Oct | Nov | Dec | Year |
|---|---|---|---|---|---|---|---|---|---|---|---|---|---|
| Mean daily maximum °C (°F) | 25 (77) | 28 (82) | 34 (93) | 38 (100) | 41 (106) | 40 (104) | 36 (97) | 34 (93) | 36 (97) | 36 (97) | 31 (88) | 27 (81) | 34 (93) |
| Mean daily minimum °C (°F) | 8 (46) | 12 (54) | 18 (64) | 23 (73) | 27 (81) | 29 (84) | 27 (81) | 26 (79) | 25 (77) | 20 (68) | 15 (59) | 9 (48) | 20 (68) |
| Average precipitation cm (inches) | 0.35 (0.14) | 0.27 (0.11) | 0.32 (0.13) | 0.35 (0.14) | 0.6 (0.2) | 3.26 (1.28) | 8.89 (3.50) | 6.44 (2.54) | 3.42 (1.35) | 0.45 (0.18) | 0.07 (0.03) | 0.06 (0.02) | 24.48 (9.62) |
Source: Foreca
