= Hellenistic influence on Indian art =

Greek influence on Indian art

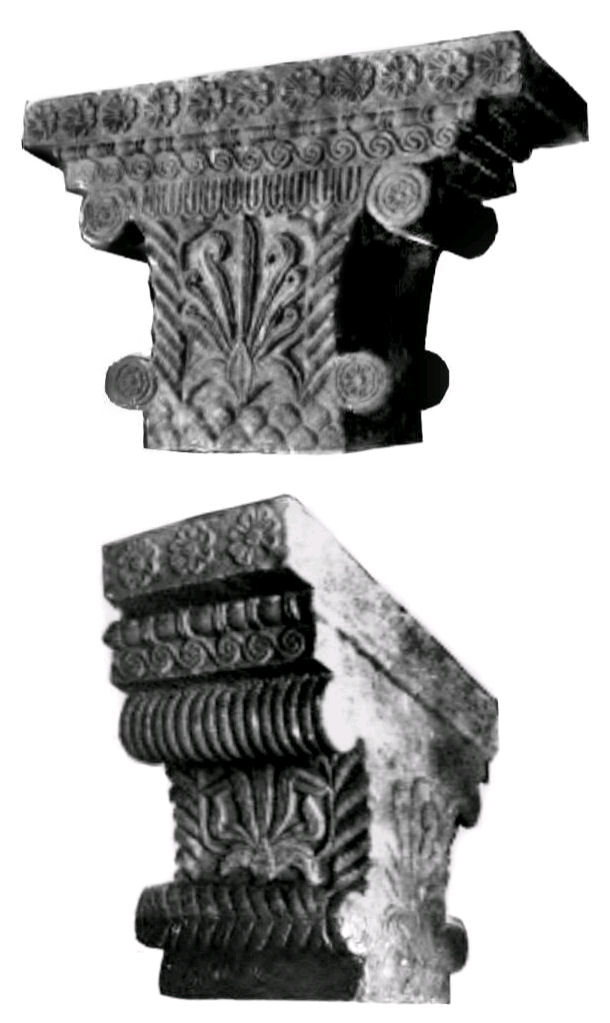
The Pataliputra capital, a Hellenistic anta capital found in the Mauryan Empire palace of Pataliputra, India, dated to the 3rd century BCE

Hellenistic influence on Indian art and architecture reflects the artistic and architectural influence of the Greeks on Indian art following the conquests of Alexander the Great, from the end of the 4th century BCE to the first centuries of the common era. The Greeks in effect maintained a political presence at the doorstep, and sometimes within India, down to the 1st century CE with the Greco-Bactrian Kingdom and the Indo-Greek Kingdoms, with many noticeable influences on the arts of the Maurya Empire (c.321–185 BCE) especially. Hellenistic influence on Indian art was also felt for several more centuries during the period of Greco-Buddhist art.However this viewpoint is not universally accepted in modern scholarship. Several objections have been raised in academic literature.

== Historical context ==
=== Achaemenid Era (518–327 BCE) ===
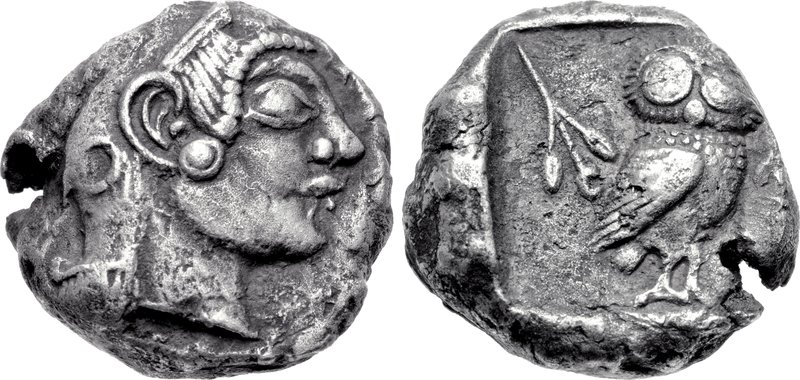
Athenian coin (minted c. 500/490 – 485 BCE) discovered in Pushkalavati, Gandhara. This coin is the earliest known example of its type to be found so far east.

Coin finds in the Kabul hoard in Kabul or the Shaikhan Dehri hoard in Pushkalavati have revealed numerous Achaemenid coins as well as many Greek coins from the 5th and 4th centuries BCE were circulating in the area, at least as far as the Indus during the rule of the Achaemenids, who were in control of the areas as far as Gandhara. In 2007 a small coin hoard was discovered at the site of ancient Pushkalavati (Shaikhan Dehri) in Pakistan, containing a tetradrachm minted in Athens c. 500/490 – 485 BCE, together with a number of local types as well as silver cast ingots. The Athens coin is the earliest known example of its type to be found so far to the east.

According to Joe Cribb, these early Greek coins were at the origin of Indian punch-marked coins, the earliest coins developed in India, which used minting technology derived from Greek coinage. Daniel Schlumberger also considers that punch-marked bars, similar to the many punch-marked bars found in northwestern India, initially originated in the Achaemenid Empire, rather than in the Indian heartland:

"The punch-marked bars were up to now considered to be Indian (...) However the weight standard is considered by some expert to be Persian, and now that we see them also being uncovered in the soil of Afghanistan, we must take into account the possibility that their country of origin should not be sought beyond the Indus, but rather in the oriental provinces of the Achaemenid Empire".

— Daniel Schlumberger, quoted from Trésors Monétaires, p. 42

=== Hellenistic period (327 BCE onward) ===
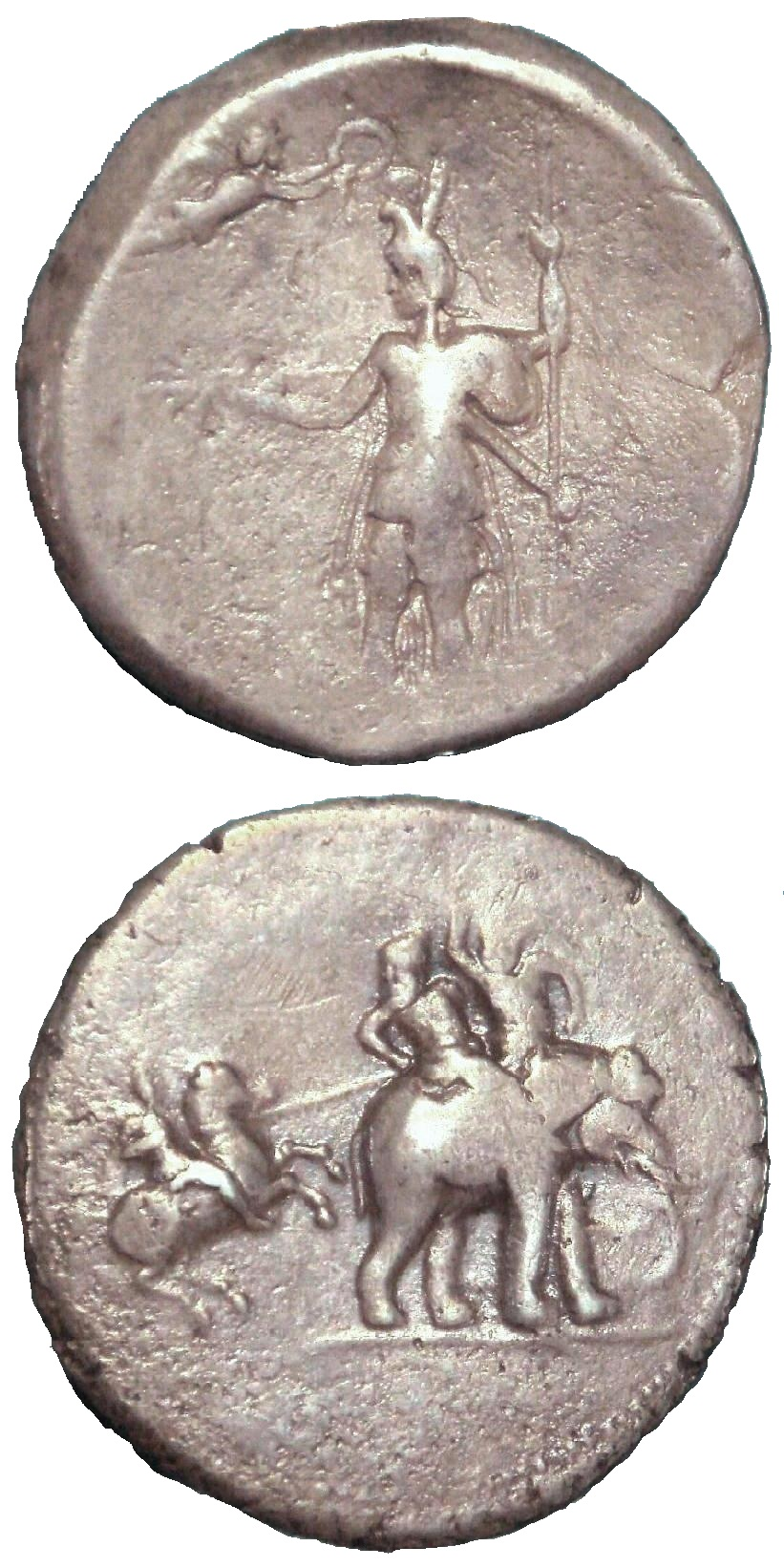
"Victory coin" of Alexander the Great, minted in Babylon c. 322 BCE, following his campaigns in the subcontinent. Obv: Alexander being crowned by Nike. Rev: Alexander attacking king Porus on his elephant. Silver. British Museum.

The Greek campaigns in India under Alexander the Great were limited in time (327–326 BCE) and in extent, but they had extensive long term effects as Greeks settled for centuries at the doorstep of India. Soon after the departure of Alexander, the Greeks (described as Yona or Yavana in Indian sources from the Greek "Ionian") may then have participated, together with other groups, in the armed uprising of Chandragupta Maurya against the Nanda Dynasty around 322 BCE, and gone as far as Pataliputra for the capture of the city from the Nandas. The Mudrarakshasa of Visakhadutta as well as the Jaina work Parisishtaparvan talk of Chandragupta's alliance with the Himalayan king Parvatka, often identified with Porus. According to these accounts, this alliance gave Chandragupta a composite and powerful army made up of Yavanas (Greeks), Kambojas, Shakas (Scythians), Kiratas (Nepalese), Parasikas (Persians) and Bahlikas (Bactrians) who took Pataliputra.

After these events, the Greeks were able to maintain a structured presence at the door of India for about three centuries, through the Seleucid Empire and the Greco-Bactrian kingdom, down to the time of the Indo-Greek kingdoms, which ended sometime in the 1st century CE. During that time, the city of Ai-Khanoum, capital of the Greco-Bactrian Kingdom, and the capitals of the Indo-Greek Kingdom, the cities of Sirkap, founded in what is now Pakistan on the Greek Hippodamian grid plan, and Sagala, now located in Pakistan 10 km from the border with India, interacted heavily with the Indian subcontinent. It is considered that Ai-Khanoum and Sirkap may have been primary actors in transmitting Western artistic influence to India, for example in the creation of the quasi-Ionic Pataliputra capital or the floral friezes of the Pillars of Ashoka. Numerous Greek ambassadors, such as Megasthenes, Deimachus and Dionysius, stayed at the Mauryan court in Pataliputra.

The scope of adoption goes from designs such as the bead and reel pattern, the central flame palmette design and a variety of other moldings, to the lifelike rendering of animal sculpture and the design and function of the Ionic anta capital in the palace of Pataliputra. After the 1st century CE, Hellenistic influence continued to be perceived in the syncretic Greco-Buddhist art of Gandhara, down to the 4th–5th centuries CE. Arguably, Hellenistic influence continued to be felt indirectly in India arts for many centuries thereafter.

== Influence on Indian monumental stone architecture (268–180 BCE) ==
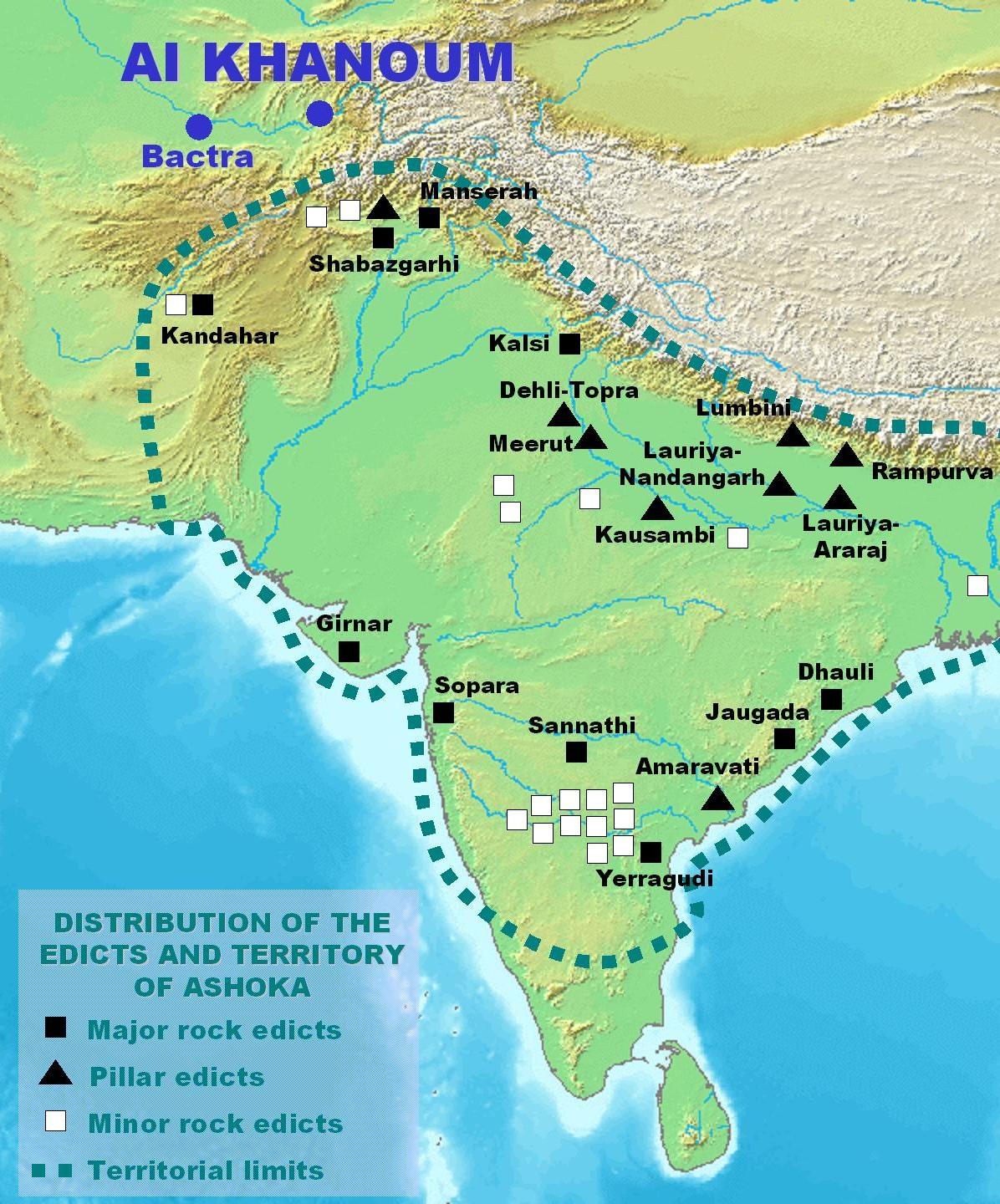
The Greco-Bactrian Kingdom and the Hellenistic city of Ai-Khanoum were located at the very doorstep of India.

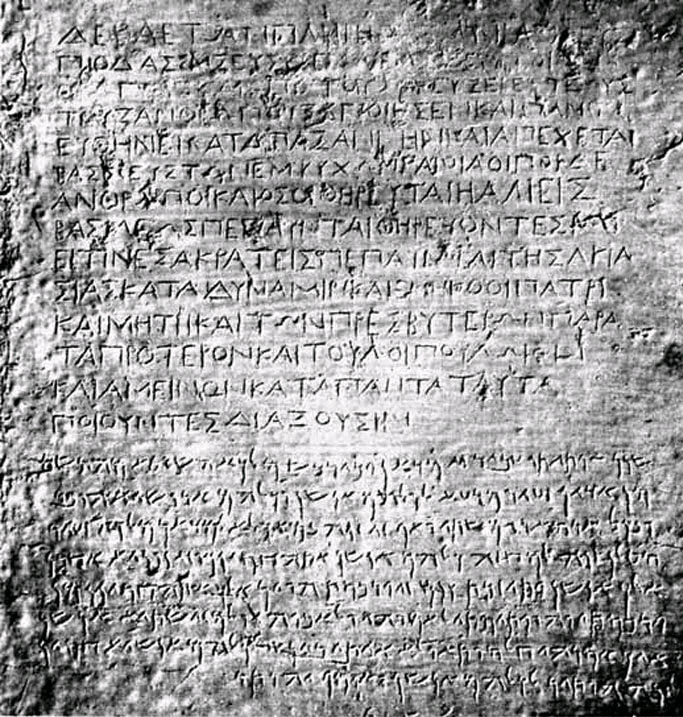
Ashoka's Kandahar Bilingual Rock Inscription in Greek and Aramaic

During the Maurya period (c. 321–185 BCE), and especially during the time of Emperor Ashoka (c.268–232 BCE), Hellenistic influence seems to have played a role in the establishment of Indian monumental stone architecture. Excavations in the ancient palace of Pataliputra have brought to light Hellenistic sculptural works, and Hellenistic influence appear in the Pillars of Ashoka at about the same period.

According to John Boardman, there were Hellenistic influences on Indian stone architecture. However, the sites and sources of these influences are "not always properly identified or yet identifiable". Three broad theories have been proposed. One was held by early scholars such as Percy Brown in which stone Indian architecture used immigrant craftsmen experienced in the Persian Achaemenid imperial style, which included much Greek input, to which further more direct Hellenistic influence was added. The second was held by later scholars such as John Irwin who favour mostly indigenous Indian inspiration, and a third held by S.P. Gupta and others, who favour a combination.

Boardman compares the appearance of stone architecture in Persia and India; to some extent the new empires of the Achaemenids and Mauryans faced similar issues in "creating stone architecture suitable to the aspirations of empire", when neither country had a tradition of building in stone. Persian conquests had included areas with important traditions of large-scale building in brick or stone; in India there was probably a tradition of large and intricate building in wood, although remains of this are naturally very few. It is possible that the difficult pass through the Hindu Kush and locations to the northwest of it such as Ai-Khanoum, a Greek city of Bactria in 3rd-century BCE and about 600 kilometres (370 mi) from Kabul, could have provided the conduit to connect the Hellenistic and Indian artists. Alternatively, the influence could have come from the ancient Persian Persepolis, now near Shiraz in southwest Iran and about 2,200 kilometres (1,400 mi) from Kabul. However, a major issue that this proposal faces is that Persepolis was destroyed about 80 years before the first Buddhist stone architecture and arts appeared. This leaves the question whether, to what extent and how knowledge was preserved or transferred over the generations between the fall of Persepolis (330 BCE) and the rise of Ashokan era art to its east (after 263 BCE).

=== Extent of relations ===
Numerous contacts have been recorded between the Maurya Empire and the Greek realm. Seleucus I Nicator attempted to conquer India in 305 BCE, but he finally came to an agreement with Chandragupta Maurya, and signed a treaty which, according to Strabo, ceded a number of territories to Chandragupta, including large parts of what is now Afghanistan and Pakistan. A "marital agreement" was also concluded, and Seleucus received five hundred war elephants, a military asset which would play a decisive role at the Battle of Ipsus in 301 BCE.

Later, numerous ambassadors visited the Indian court in Pataliputra, especially Megasthenes to Chandragupta, later Deimakos to his son Bindusara, and later again Ptolemy II Philadelphus, the ruler of Ptolemaic Egypt and contemporary of Ashoka, is also recorded by Pliny the Elder as having sent an ambassador named Dionysius to the Mauryan court. Ashoka made communications with Greek populations on the site of Alexandria Arachosia (Old Kandahar), using the Kandahar Bilingual Rock Inscription or the Kandahar Greek Inscription.

The Greco-Bactrian Kingdom with its capital of Ai-Khanoum maintained a strong Hellenistic presence at the doorstep of India from 280–140 BCE, and after that date went into India itself to form Indo-Greek kingdoms which would last until the 1st century CE. At the same time, Ashoka wrote some of his edicts in Greek, and claimed to have sent ambassadors to Greek rulers as far as the Mediterranean, suggesting his willingness to communicate with the Hellenistic realm.

=== Instances of Hellenistic influence ===
During that period, several instance of artistic influence are known, particular in the area of monumental stone sculpture and statuary, an area with no known precedents in India. The main period of stone architectural creation seems to correspond to the period of Ashoka's reign (c.?268–232 BCE). Before that, Indians may have had a tradition of wooden architecture, but no remains have ever been found to prove that point. However remains of wooden palisades were discovered at archaeological sites in Pataliputra, confirmed Classical accounts that the city had such wooden ramparts. The first examples of stone architecture were also found in the palace compound of Pataliputra, with the distinctly Hellenistic Pataliputra capital and a pillared hall using polished-stone columns. The other remarkable example of monumental stone architecture is that of the Pillars of Ashoka, themselves displaying Hellenistic influence. Overall, according to Boardman, "the visual experience of many Ashokan and later city dwellers in India was considerably conditioned by foreign arts, translated to an Indian environment, just as the archaic Greek had been by the Syrian, the Roman by the Greek, and the Persian by the art of their whole empire".

==== Pataliputra capital (3rd century BCE) ====
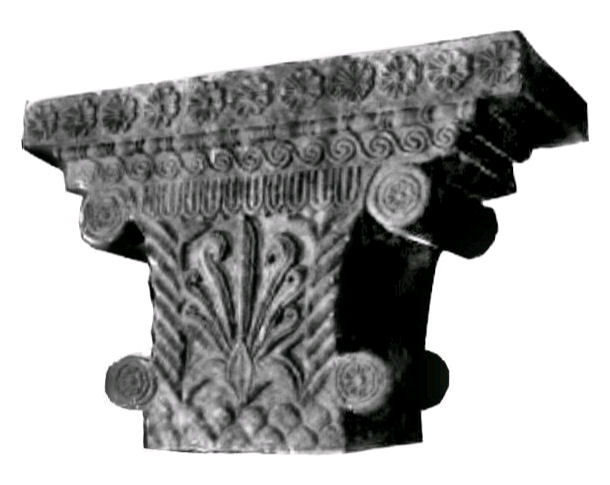
Front of the Pataliputra capital, found in Pataliputra and dated to the 3rd century BCE

The Pataliputra capital is a monumental rectangular capital with volutes and Classical designs, that was discovered in the palace ruins of the ancient Mauryan Empire capital city of Pataliputra (modern Patna, northeastern India). It is dated to the 3rd century BCE. It is, together with the Pillars of Ashoka, one of the first known examples of Indian stone architecture, as no Indian stone monuments or sculptures are known from before that period. It is also one of the first archaeological clues suggesting Hellenistic influence on the arts of India, in this case sculptural palatial art. The Archaeological Survey of India, an Indian government agency attached to the Ministry of culture that is responsible for archaeological research and the conservation and preservation of cultural monument in India, straightforwardly describes it as "a colossal capital in the Hellenistic style".

Although this capital was a major piece of architecture in the Mauryan palace of Pataliputra, since most of Pataliputra was not excavated, and remains hidden under the modern city of Patna, it is impossible to know the exact nature or extent of the monuments or the buildings that incorporated it.

One capital from Sarnath is known, which seems to be an adaptation of the design of the Pataliputra capital. This other capital is also said to be from the Mauryan period. It is, together with the Pataliputra capital, considered as "stone brackets or capitals suggestive of the Ionic order". A later capital found in Mathura dating to the 2nd or 3rd century (Kushan period) displays a central palmette with side volutes in a style described as "Ionic", in the same kind of composition as the Pataliputra capital but with a coarser rendering. (photograph).

==== Pillars of Ashoka (3rd century BCE) ====
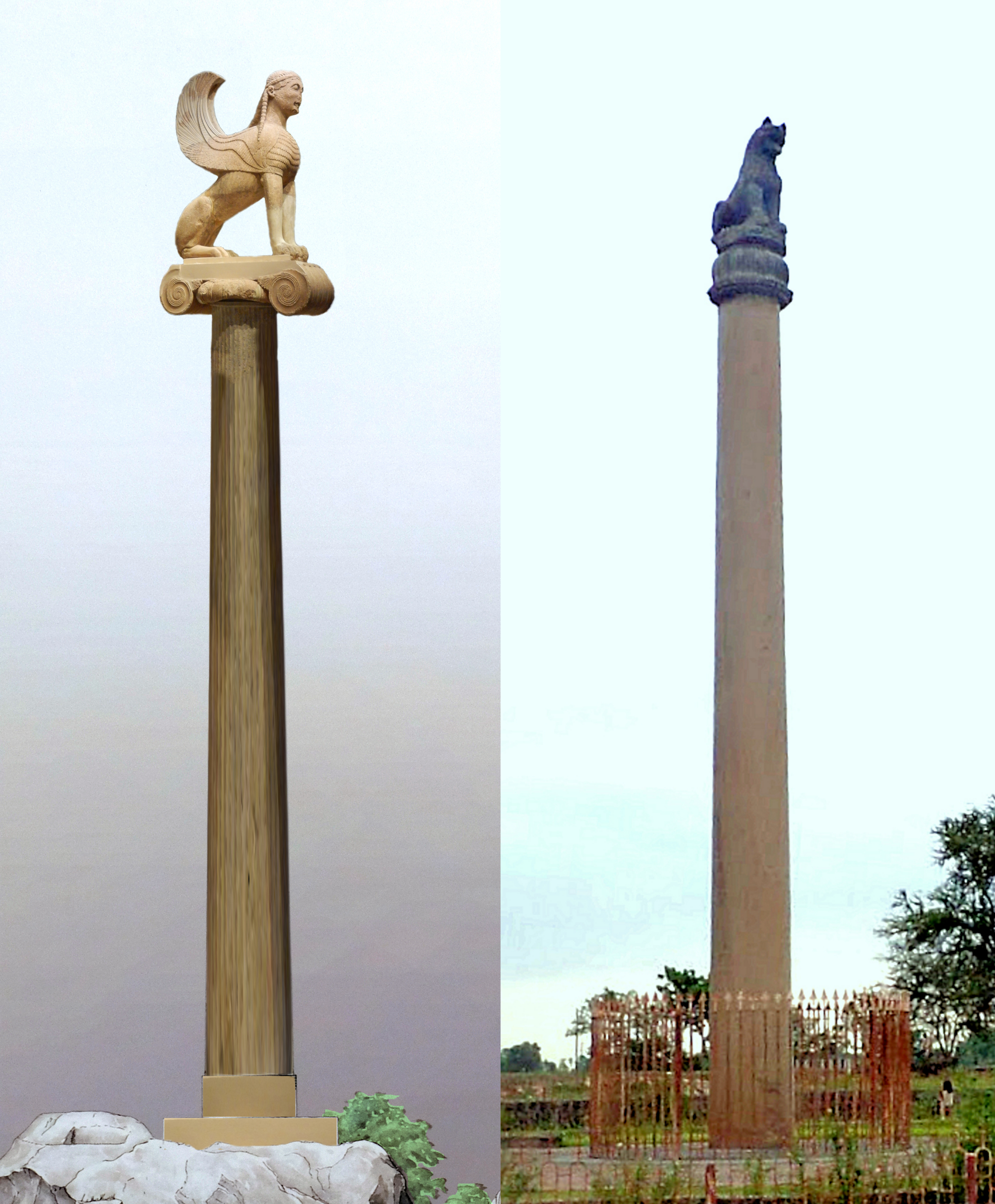
Greek votive columns such as the Sphinx of Naxos, Delphi, 560 BCE (left), may have influenced the creation of the Pillars of Ashoka, 250 BCE (here at Lauria Nandangarh).

The Pillars of Ashoka were built during the reign of the Maurya Empire Ashoka c. 250 BCE. They were new attempts at mastering stone architecture, as no Indian stone monuments or sculptures are known from before that period.

There are altogether seven remaining capitals, five with lions, one with an elephant and one with a zebu bull. One of them, the four lions of Sarnath, has become the State Emblem of India. The animal capitals are composed of a lotiform base, with an abacus decorated with floral, symbolic or animal designs, topped by the realistic depiction of an animal, thought to each represent a traditional direction in India.

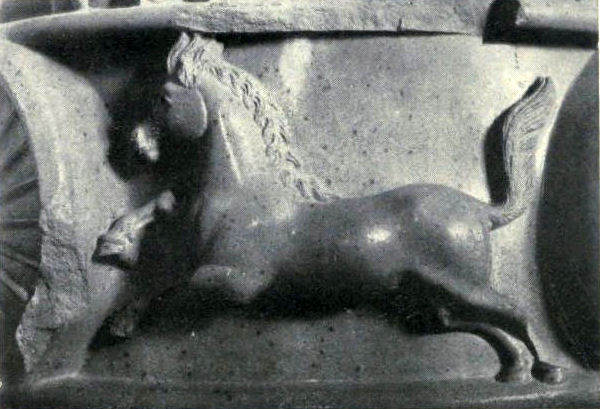
The horse motif on the Sarnath Lion Capital of Ashoka is often described as an example of Hellenistic realism.

Various foreign influences have been described in the design of these capitals.

Greek columns of the 6th century BCE such as the Sphinx of Naxos, a 12.5m Ionic column crowned by a sitting animal in the religious center of Delphi, may have been an inspiration for the pillars of Ashoka. Many similar columns crowned by sphinxes were discovered in ancient Greece, as in Sparta, Athens or Spata, and some were used as funerary steles. The Greek sphinx, a lion with the face of a human female, was considered as having ferocious strength, and was thought of as a guardian, often flanking the entrances to temples or royal tombs. Placing animals on top of a lotiform capital also reminds of Achaemenid columns.

The animals, especially the horse on the Sarnath Lion Capital of Ashoka or the bull of the Rampurva capital are said to be typically Greek in realism, and belong to a type of highly realistic treatment which cannot be found in Persia.

The abacus parts also often seem to display a strong influence of Greek art: in the case of the Rampurva bull or the Sankassa elephant, it is composed of flame palmettes alternated with stylized lotuses and small rosettes flowers. A similar kind of design can be seen in the frieze of the lost capital of the Allahabad pillar. These designs likely originated in Greek and Near-Eastern arts. They would probably have come from the neighboring Seleucid Empire, and specifically from a Hellenistic city such as Ai-Khanoum, located at the doorstep of India.

==== Temple architecture (3rd century BCE) ====
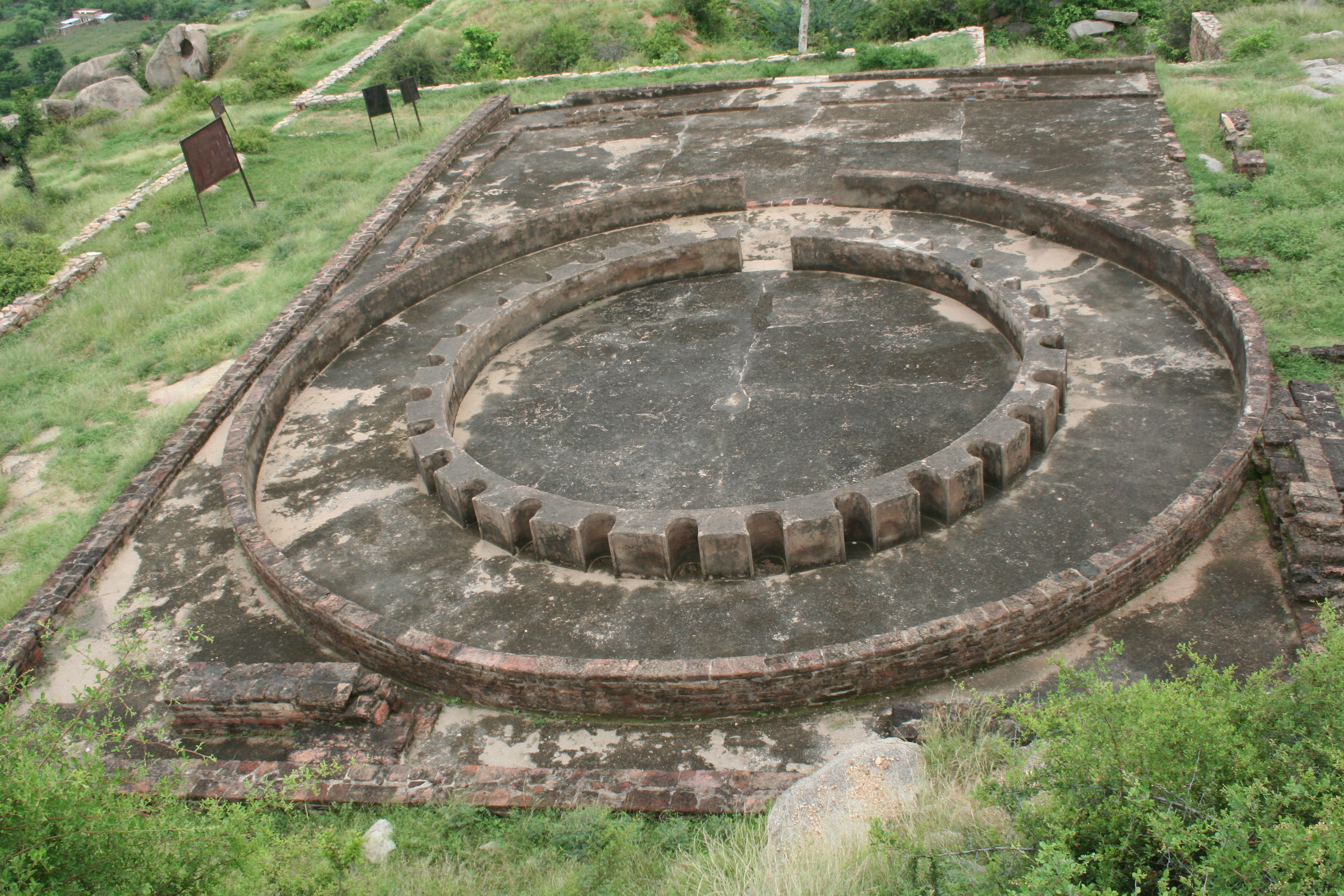
Remains of the circular temple at Bairat. A stupa was located in the center, with a colonnade and a circular wall around.

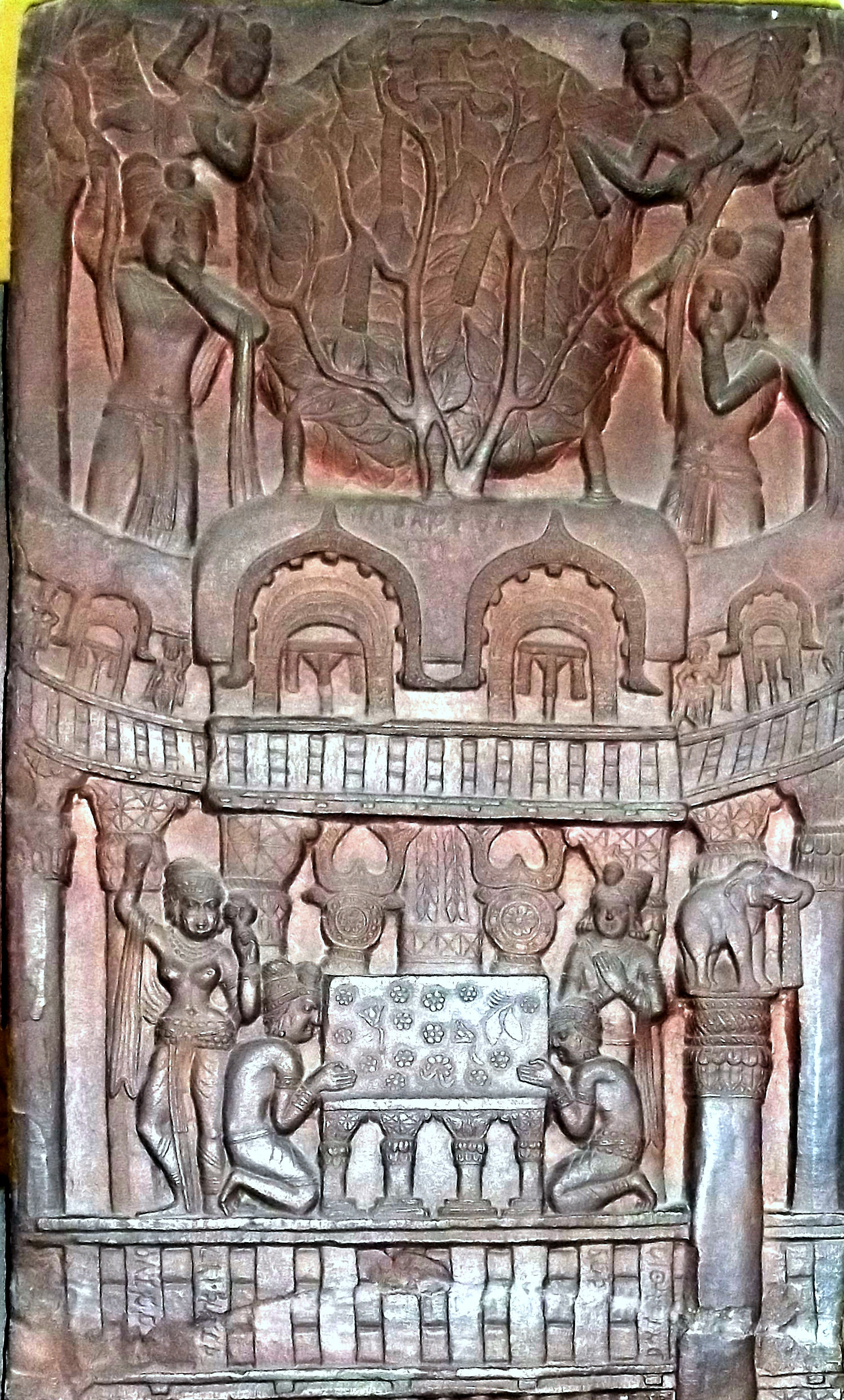
Ashoka's circular Mahabodhi Temple, Bharhut

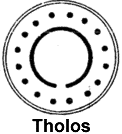
Plan of a Greek Tholos temple

Some of the earliest free-standing temples in India are thought to have been of a circular type, as the Bairat Temple in Bairat, Rajasthan, formed of a central stupa surrounded by a circular colonnade and an enclosing wall, built during the time of Ashoka and near which were found several Minor Rock Edicts. Ashoka also built the Mahabodhi Temple in Bodh Gaya c. 250 BCE, also a circular structure, in order to protect the Bodhi tree. Representations of this early temple structure are found on a 100 BCE relief from the stupa railing at Bhārhut, as well as in Sanchi. These circular-type temples were also found in later rock-hewn caves such as Tulja Caves or Guntupalli.

It has been suggested that these circular structures with colonnades may have originated with the Greek circular Tholos temple, as in the Tholos of Delphi, but circular wooden huts in India could also have been an inspiration.

==== Diamond throne of Bodh Gaya (3rd century BCE) ====
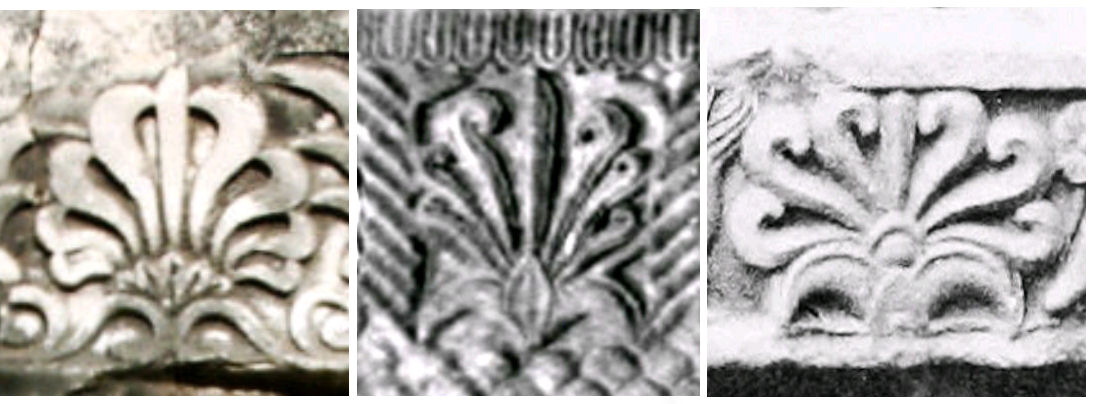
Greek and Indian flame palmettes. Left: Flame palmette at Didyma, Ionia, c.300 BCE. Middle: Pataliputra capital, India, c.3rd century BCE. Right: Ashoka's Diamond throne, Bodh Gaya, India, 250 BCE.

The Diamond throne, or Vajrasana, is a throne in the Mahabodhi Temple at Bodh Gaya, built by king Ashoka c. 260 BCE, in order to mark the place where the Buddha reached enlightenment. Ashoka is thought to have visited Bodh Gaya around 260 BCE, about 10 years into his reign, as explained by his Rock Edict number VIII.

The Diamond throne contains carvings of honeysuckles and geese, which can also be found on several of the pillar capital of Ashoka.

==== Decorative moldings and sculptures ====
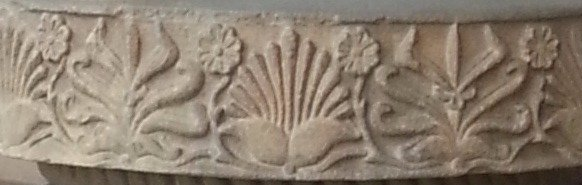
Rampurva bull capital, detail of the abacus, with two "flame palmettes" framing a lotus surrounded by small rosette flowers

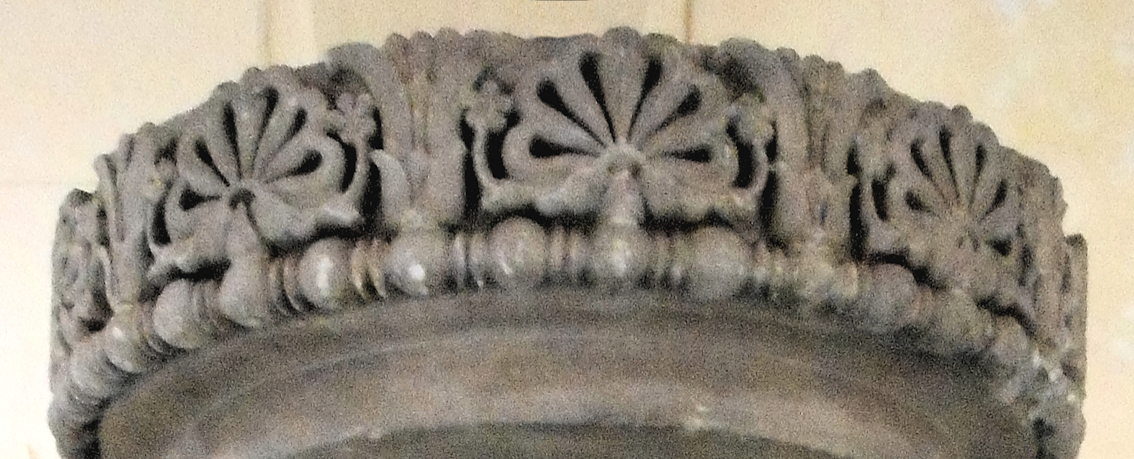
Two lotuses framing a "flame palmette" surrounded by small rosette flowers, over a band of beads and reels. Allahabad pillar, circa 250 BCE.

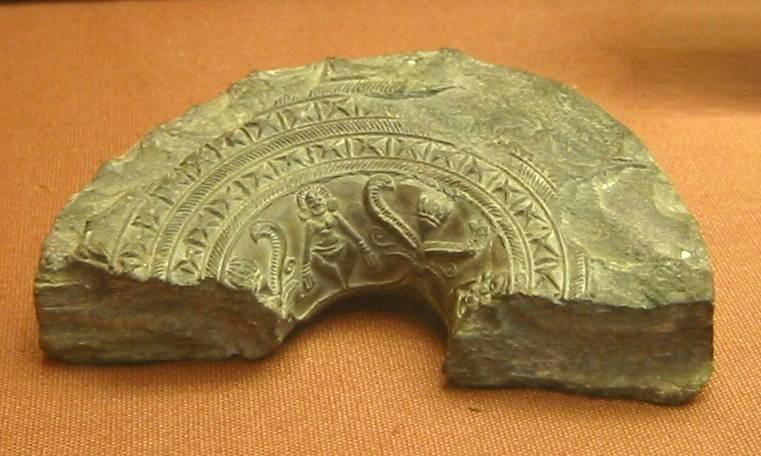
Hellenistic "flame palmette" designs have also been identified on Mauryan ringstones, here framing the image of a goddess.

===== Flame palmette =====
The flame palmette, central decorative element of the Pataliputra pillar is considered as a purely Greek motif. The first appearance of "flame palmettes" goes back to the stand-alone floral akroteria of the Parthenon (447–432 BCE), and slightly later at the Temple of Athena Nike. Flame palmettes were then introduced into friezes of floral motifs in replacement of the regular palmette. Flame palmettes are used extensively in India floral friezes, starting with the floral friezes on the capitals of the pillar of Ashoka, and they are likely to have originated with Greek or Near Eastern art. A monumental flame palmette can be seen on the top of the Sunga gateway at Bharhut (2nd century BCE).

===== Botanical combinations =====
According to Boardman, although lotus friezes or palmette friezes were known in Mesopotamia centuries before, the unnatural combination of various botanical elements which have no relationship in the wild, such as the palmette, the lotus and sometimes rosette flowers, is a purely Greek innovation, which was then adopted on a very broad geographical scale.

===== Bead and reel =====
According to art historian John Boardman, the bead and reels motif was entirely developed in Greece from motifs derived from the turning techniques used for wood and metal, and was first employed in stone sculpture in Greece during the 6th century BCE. The motif then spread to Persia, Egypt and the Hellenistic world, and as far as India, where it can be found on the abacus part of some of the Pillars of Ashoka or the Pataliputra capital.

=== Influence on monumental statuary ===
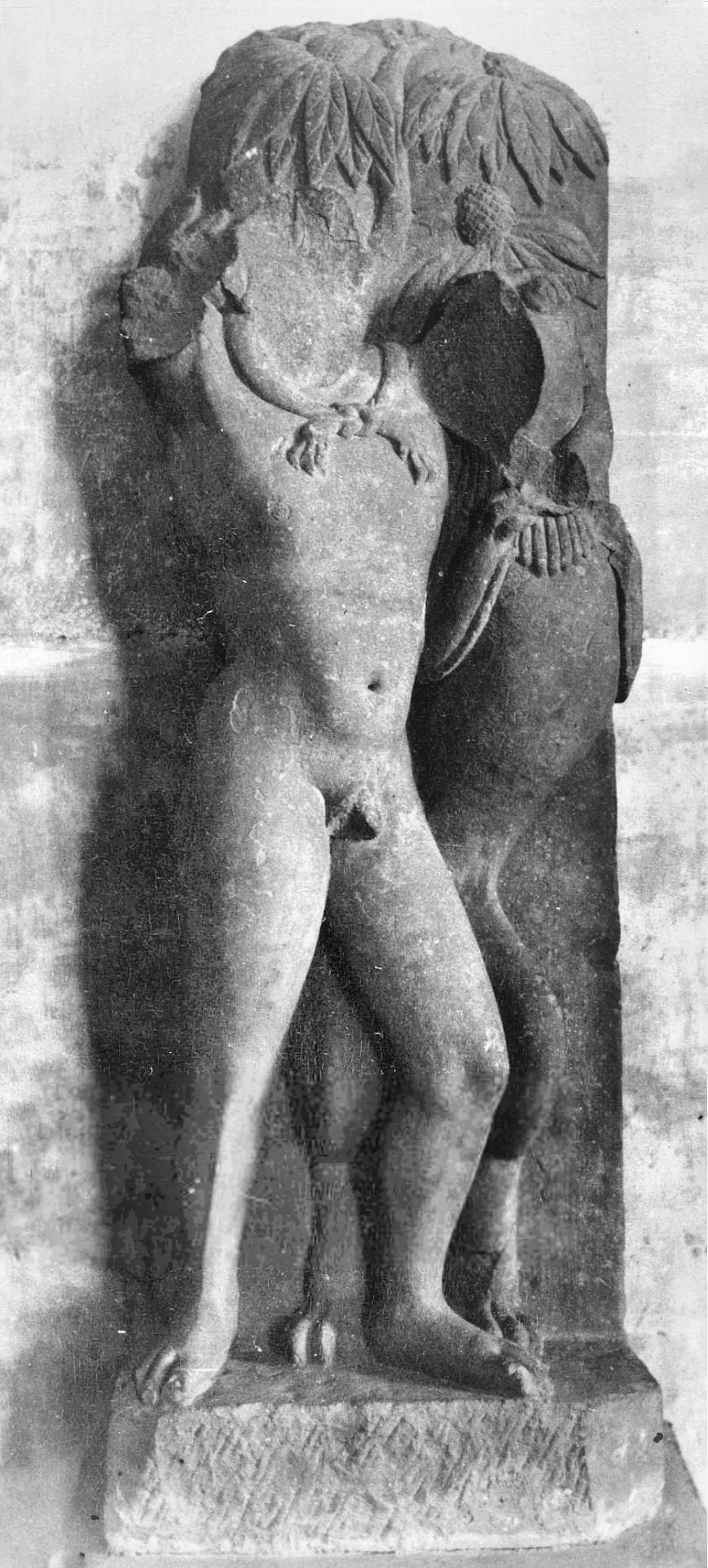
The Mathura Herakles. A statue of Herakles strangling the Nemean lion, from Mathura. Also: . Kolkota Indian Museum.

Hellenistic arts may have been influential in early statuary (Mauryan and Sunga periods). A few monumental Yakshas are considered as the earliest free-standing statues in India . The treatment of the dress especially, with lines of geometric folds, is considered as a Hellenistic innovation. There are no known previous example of such statuary in India, and they closely resemble Greek Late Archaic mannerism which could have been transmitted to India through Achaemenid Persia. This motif appears again in the Sunga works of Bharhut, especially on a depiction of a foreign soldier, but the same treatment of the dress is also visible on purely Indian figures.

In some cases, a clear influence from the art of Gandhara can also be felt, as in the case of the Hellenistic statue of Herakles strangling the Nemean lion, discovered in Mathura, and now in the Kolkota Indian Museum, as well as Bacchanalian scenes. Although inspired from the art of Gandhara, the portraiture of Herakles is not perfectly exact and may show a lack of understanding of the subject matter, as Herakles is shown already wearing the skin of the lion he is fighting.

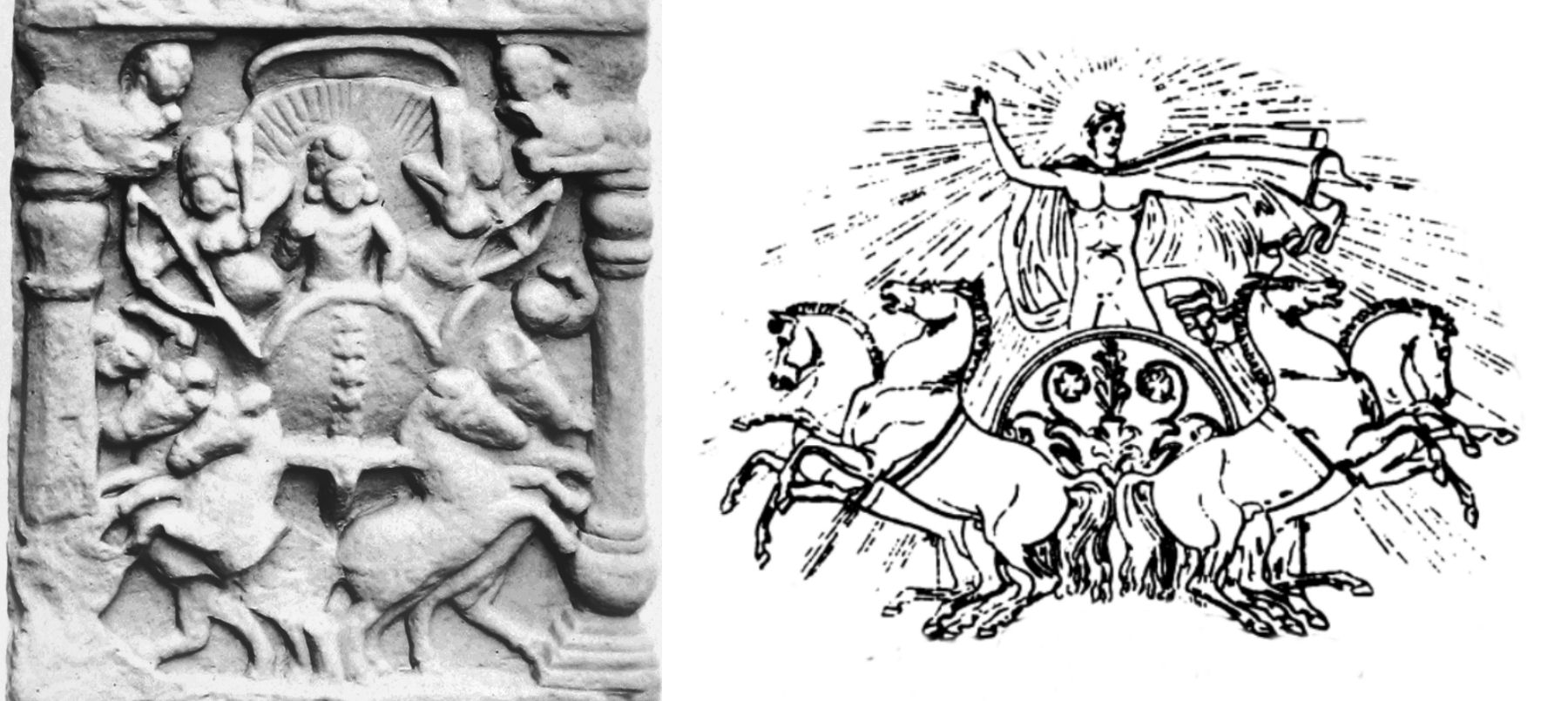
Comparison of Bodh Gaya quadriga relief of Surya (left) and Classical example of Phoebus Apollo on quadriga (right)

A famous relief from Bodh Gaya showing the Indian god Surya on a quadriga is also often mentioned as a possible example of Hellenistic influence on Indian art. The Surya depiction is indeed very similar to some Greek reliefs of Apollo on his quadriga horse chariot. Other authors point to the influence of Greco-Bactrian coinage in which similar quadriga scenes sometimes appear, as on the coinage of Plato of Bactria.

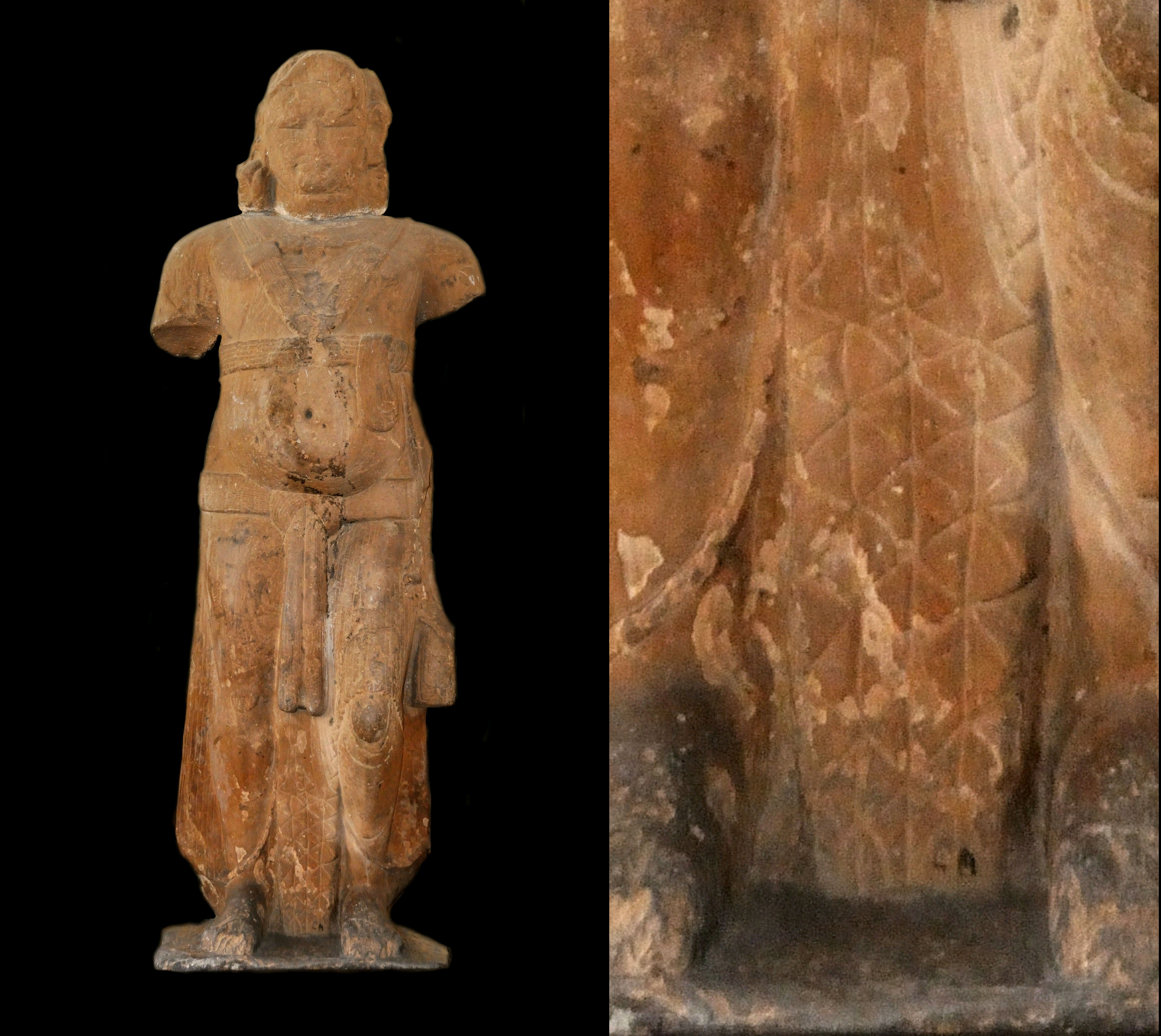
Yaksha Manibhadra, Parkham near Mathura with detail of the dress with geometric fold of the hem

Sculpture of woman from ancient Braj-Mathura c. 2nd century CE

=== First visual representations of Indian deities ===
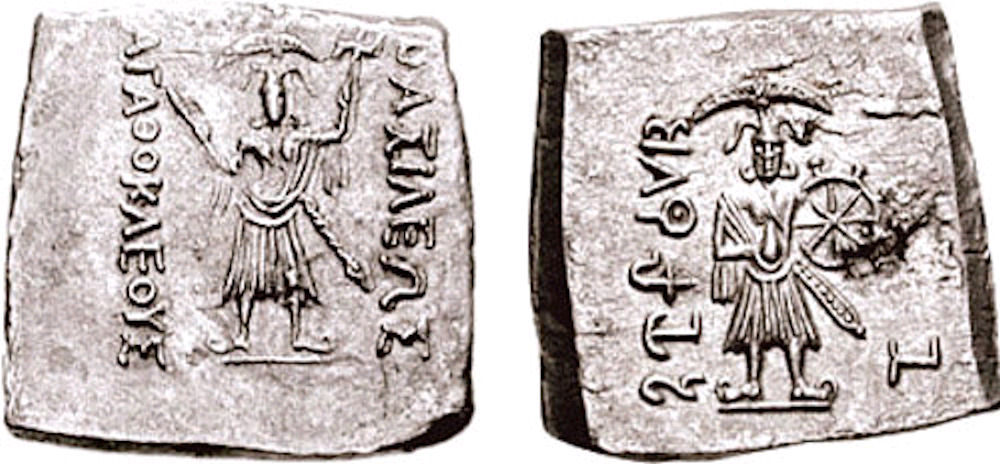
Coin of Greco-Bactrian king Agathocles with Hindu deities: Vasudeva–Krishna and Balarama–Samkarshana

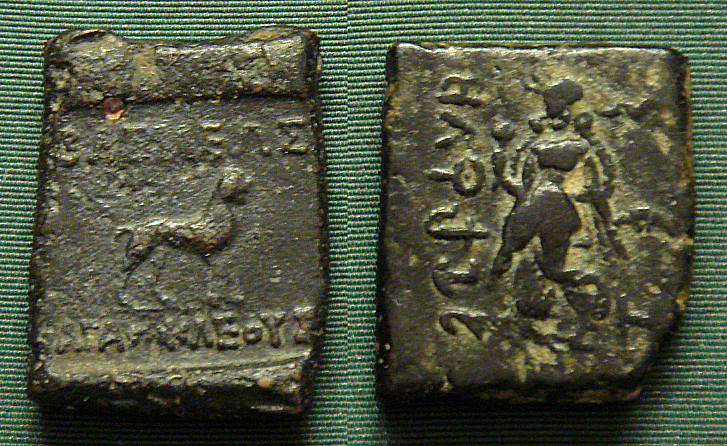
Indian coinage of Agathocles, with Buddhist lion and dancing woman holding lotus, possible Indian goddess Lakshmi, a goddess of abundance and fortune for Buddhists

One of the last Greco-Bactrian kings, Agathocles of Bactria (r. 190–180 BCE), issued remarkable Indian-standard square coins bearing the first known representations of Indian deities, which have been variously interpreted as Vishnu, Shiva, Vasudeva, Buddha or Balarama. Altogether, six such Indian-standard silver drachmas in the name of Agathocles were discovered at Ai-Khanoum in 1970. Some other coins by Agathocles are also thought to represent the Buddhist lion and the Indian goddess Lakshmi. The Indian coinage of Agathocles is few but spectacular. These coins at least demonstrate the readiness of Greek kings to represent deities of foreign origin. The dedication of a Greek envoy to the cult of Garuda at the Heliodorus pillar in Besnagar could also be indicative of some level of religious syncretism.

== Direct influence in Northwestern India (180 BCE – 20 CE) ==
The Indo-Greek period (180 BCE – 20 CE) marks a time when Bactrian Greeks established themselves directly in the northwestern parts of the Indian subcontinent following the fall of the Maurya Empire and its takeover by the Sunga.

=== Religious buildings ===
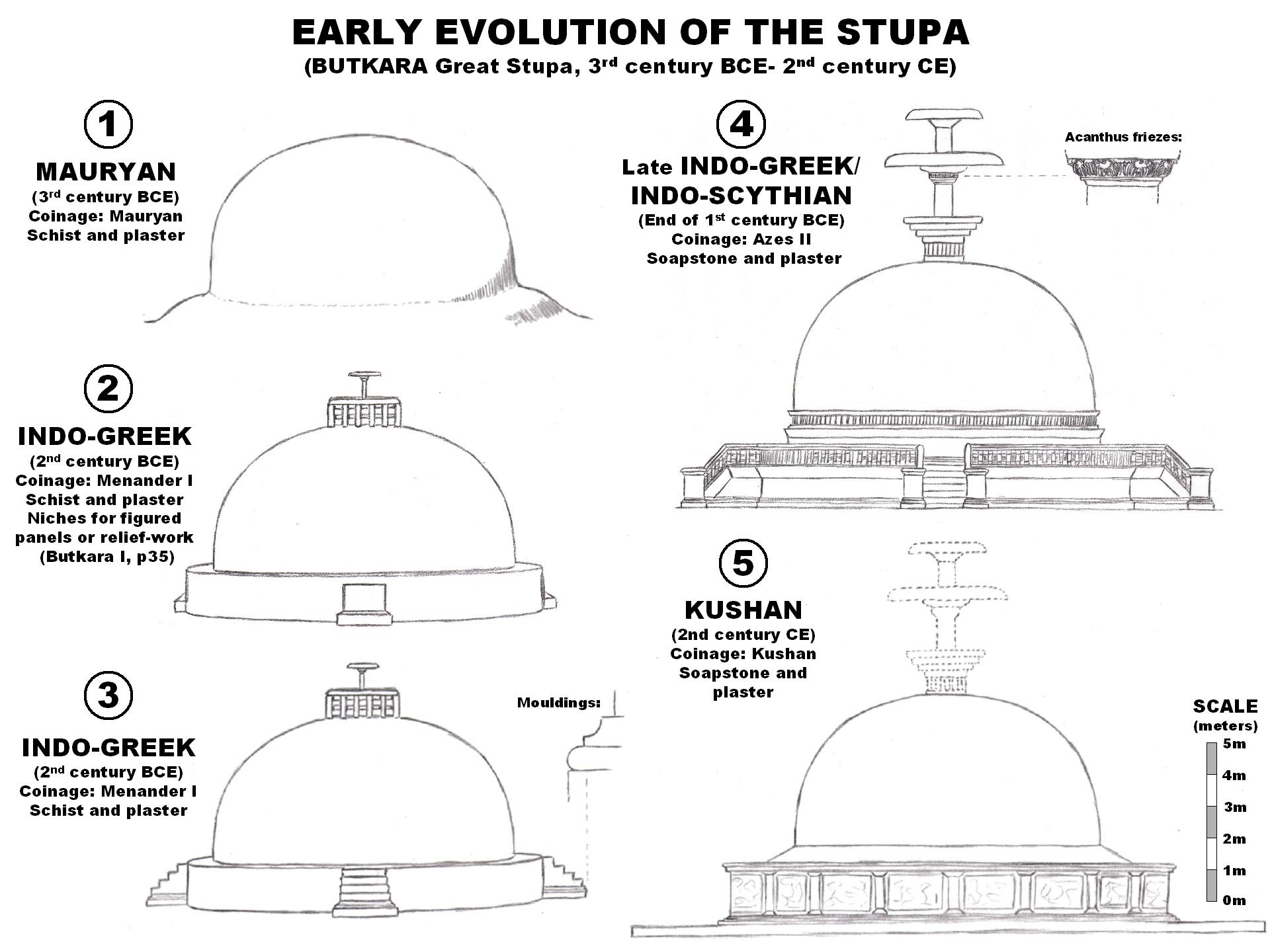
The Butkara stupa was reinforced and decorated from the Indo-Greek period on.

Indo-Greek territories seems to have been highly involved with Buddhism. Numerous stupas, which had been set up during the time of Ashoka, were then reinforced and embellished during the Indo-Greek period, using elements of Hellenistic sculpture. A detailed archaeological analysis was made especially at the Butkara stupa which allowed to define precisely what had been made during the Indo-Greek period, and what came later. The Indo-Greeks are known for the additions and niches, stairs and balustrades in Hellenistic architectural style. These efforts would then continue during the Indo-Scythian and Kushan periods.

=== Greeks in Indian stone reliefs ===
Numerous depictions of Greeks are known from the area of Gandhara. The Buner reliefs in particular have some of the clearest depictions of revelers and devotees in Greek attire.

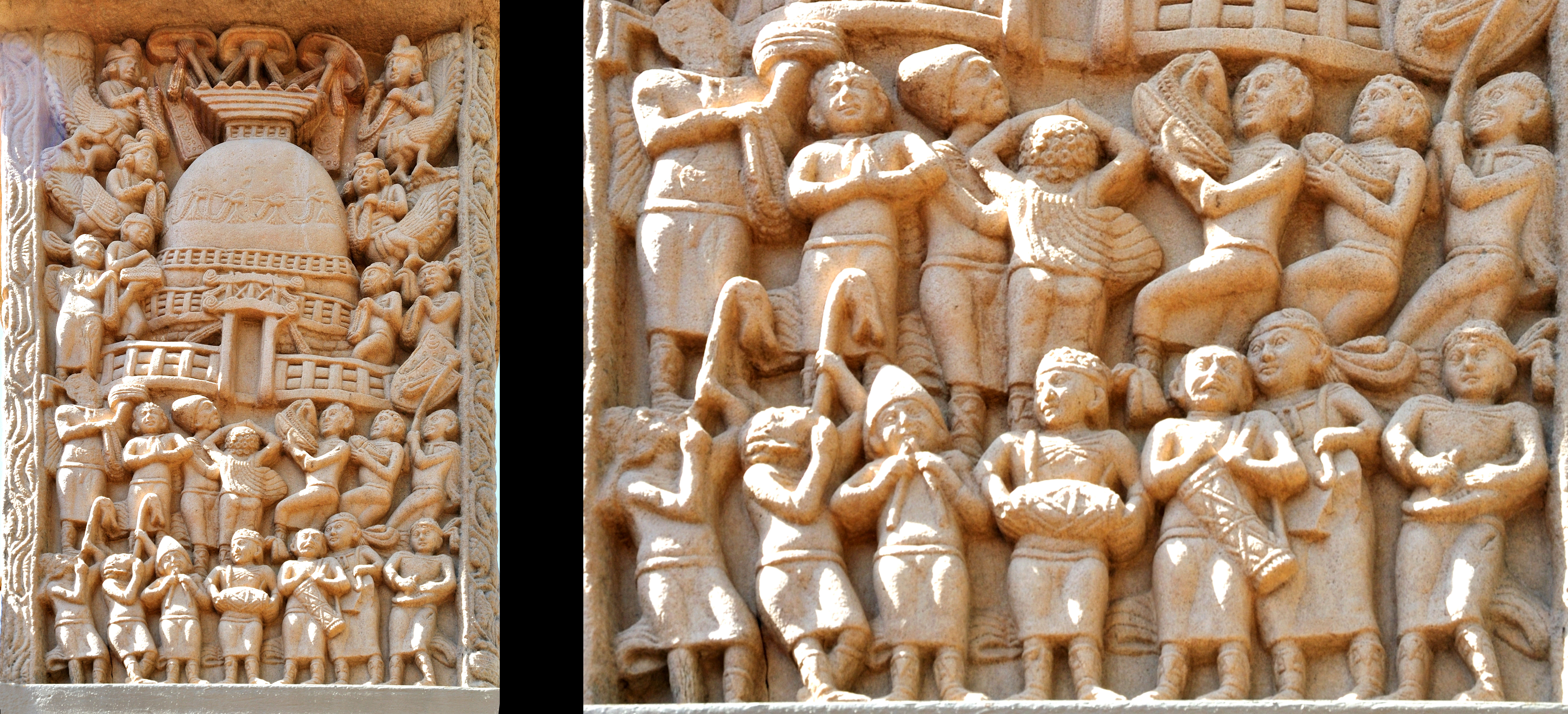
Foreign devotees and musicians on the Northern Gateway of Stupa I, Sanchi

Buddhist monuments in the heartland of India also have such depictions. Some of the friezes of Sanchi show devotees in Greek attire. The men are depicted with short curly hair, often held together with a headband of the type commonly seen on Greek coins. The clothing too is Greek, complete with tunics, capes and sandals, typical of the Greek travelling costume. The musical instruments are also quite characteristic, such as the double flute called aulos. Also visible are carnyx-like horns. They are all celebrating at the entrance of the stupa. These men would be foreigners from north-west India visiting the Stupa, possibly Mallas, Sakas or Indo-Greeks.

Three inscriptions are known from Yavana donors at Sanchi, the clearest of which reads "Setapathiyasa Yonasa danam" ("Gift of the Yona of Setapatha"), Setapatha being an uncertain city.

Another rather similar foreigner is also depicted in Bharhut, the Bharhut Yavana, also wearing a tunic and a royal headband in the manner of a Greek king, and displaying a Buddhist triratna on his sword.

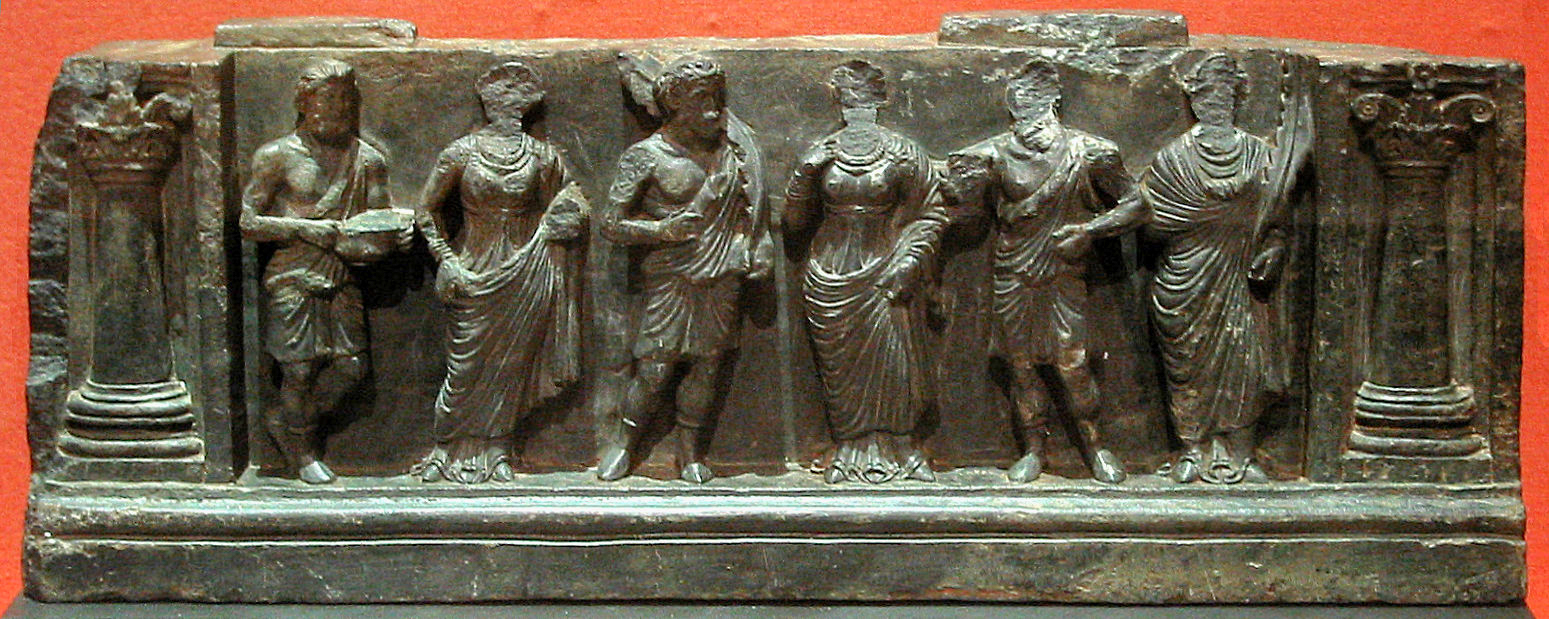
Greeks celebrating, Buner relief, Victoria and Albert Museum

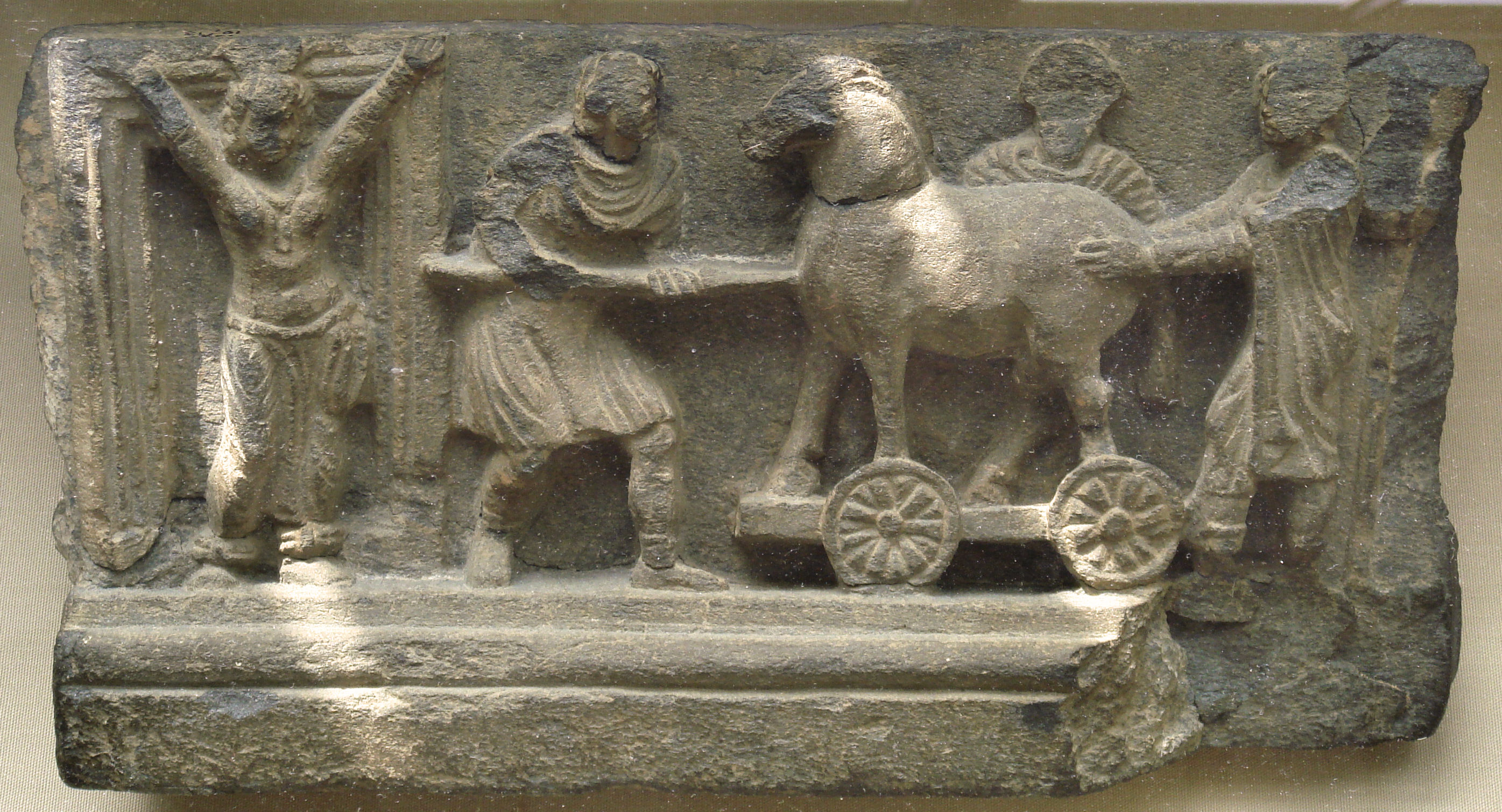
The story of the Trojan horse in the art of Gandhara, British Museum

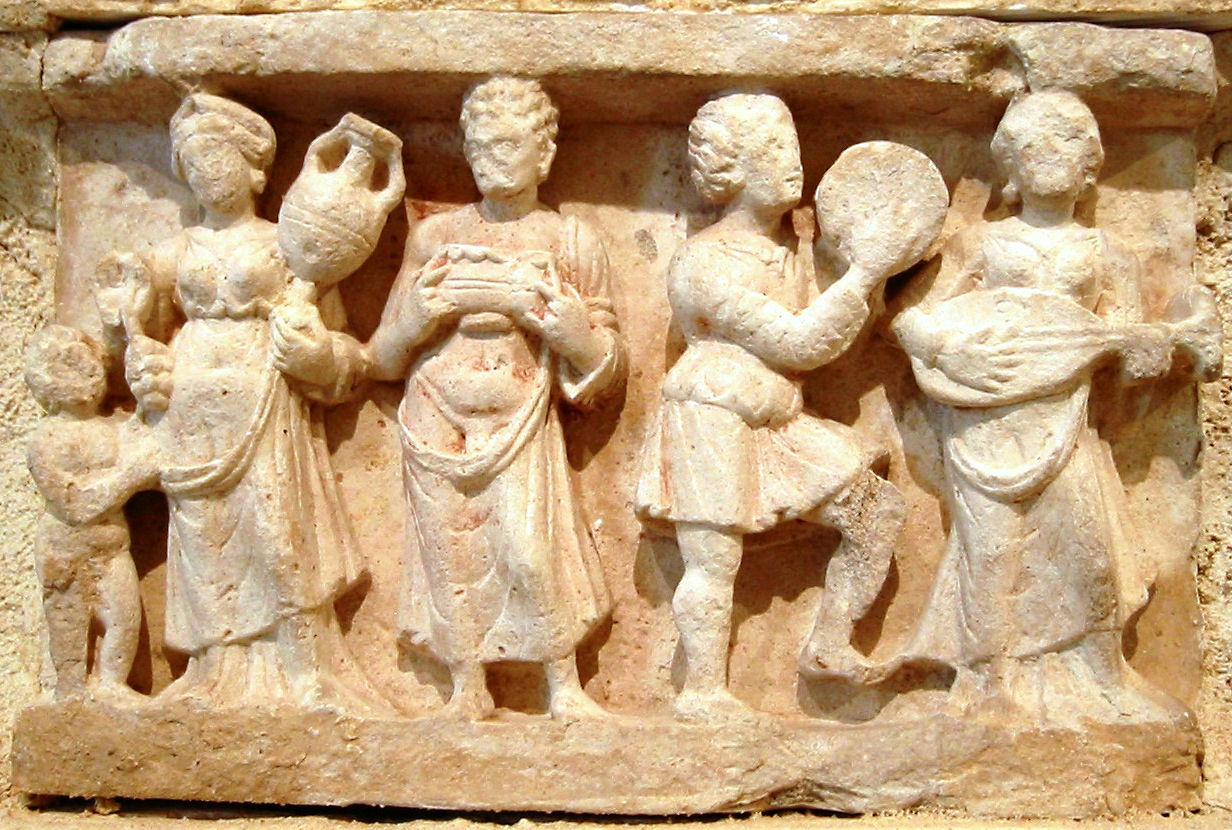
Greek clothes, amphoras, wine and music (detail of Chakhil-i-Ghoundi stupa, Hadda

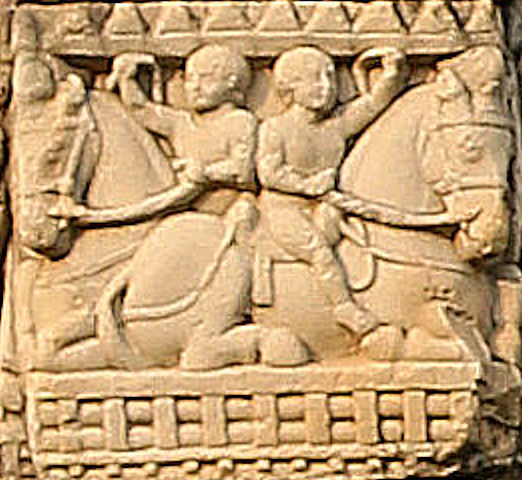
Foreign horse riders, Southern Gateway of Stupa 3, Sanchi

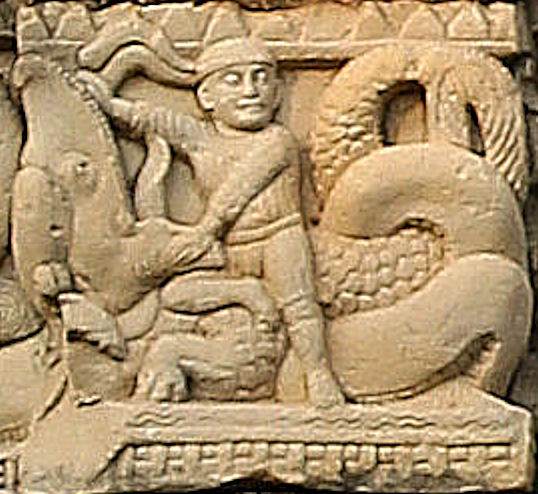
Foreigner fighting a Makara, Southern Gateway of Stupa 3, Sanchi

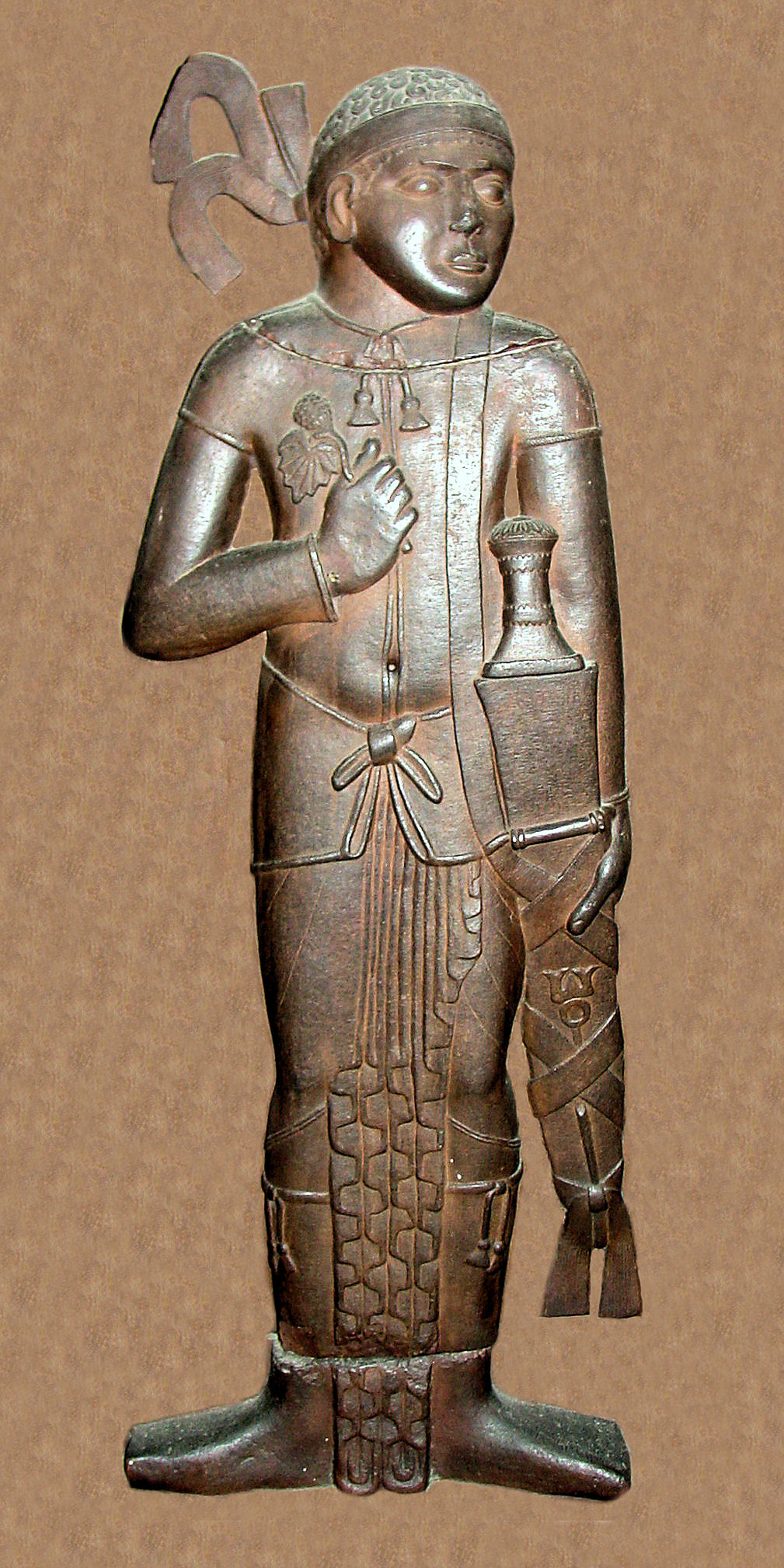
The Yavana at the Bharhut Stupa

=== Depiction of the Buddha in human form ===
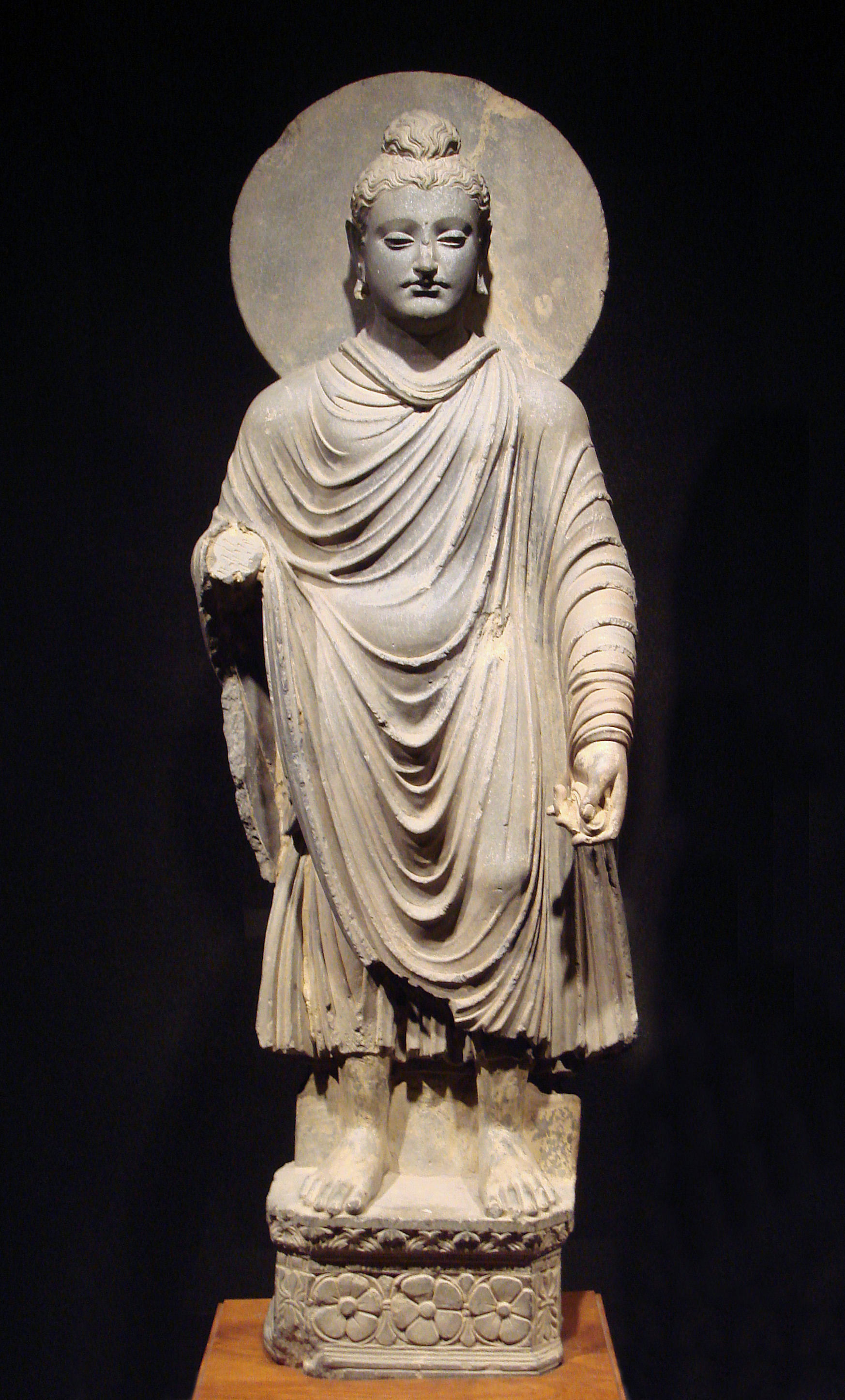
Gautama Buddha in Greco-Buddhist style, 1st–2nd centuries CE, Gandhara (modern eastern Afghanistan)

Numerous Greek artifacts were found in the city of Sirkap, near Taxila in modern Pakistan and in Sagala, a city in modern Pakistan 10 km from the border with India. Sirkap was founded as a capital of the Indo-Greek Kingdom and was laid-out on the Greek Hippodamian city plan; Sagala was also an Indo-Greek capital. Individuals in Greek dress can be identified on numerous friezes.

Although there is still some debate, the first anthropomorphic representations of the Buddha himself are often considered a result of the Greco-Buddhist interaction. Before this innovation, Buddhist art was aniconic, or very largely so: the Buddha was only represented through his symbols (an empty throne, the Bodhi Tree, Buddha footprints, the Dharmachakra).

Probably not feeling bound by these restrictions, and because of "their cult of form, the Greeks were the first to attempt a sculptural representation of the Buddha". In many parts of the Ancient World, the Greeks did develop syncretic divinities, that could become a common religious focus for populations with different traditions: a well-known example is Serapis, introduced by Ptolemy I Soter in Egypt, who combined aspects of Greek and Egyptian Gods. In India as well, it was only natural for the Greeks to create a single common divinity by combining the image of a Greek god-king (Apollo, with the traditional physical characteristics of the Buddha).

Some authors have argued that the Greek sculptural treatment of the dress has been adopted for the Buddha and Bodhisattvas throughout India. It is, even today, a hallmark of numerous Buddhist sculptures as far as China and Japan.

=== Coinage ===
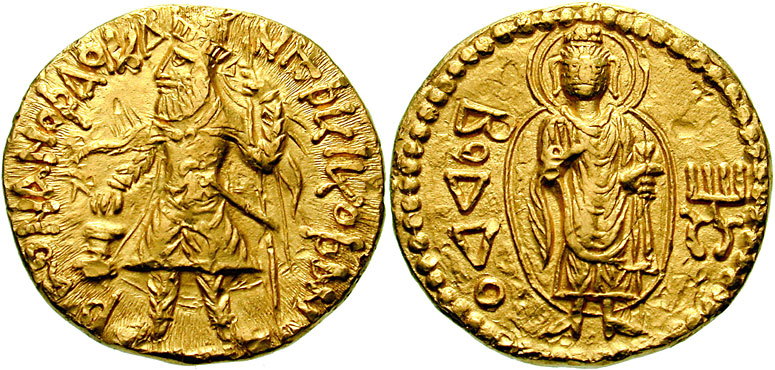
Gold coin of Kanishka, with a depiction of the Buddha, with the legend "Boddo" in Greek script; Ahin Posh

Indo-Greek coinage is rich and varied, and contains some of the best coins of antiquity. Its influence on Indian coinage was far-reaching. The Greek script became used extensively on coins for many centuries, as was the habit of depicting a ruler on the obverse, often in profile, and deities on the reverse. The Western Satrap, a western dynasty of foreign origin adopted Indo-Greek designs. The Kushans (1st–4th centuries CE) used the Greek script and Greek deities on their coinage. Even as late as the Gupta Empire (4th-6th centuries CE), Kumaragupta I issued coins with an imitation of Greek script.

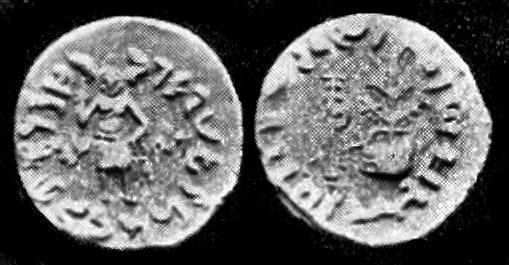
Coin of the Audumbaras influenced by Indo-Greek coin styles. 2nd century BCE

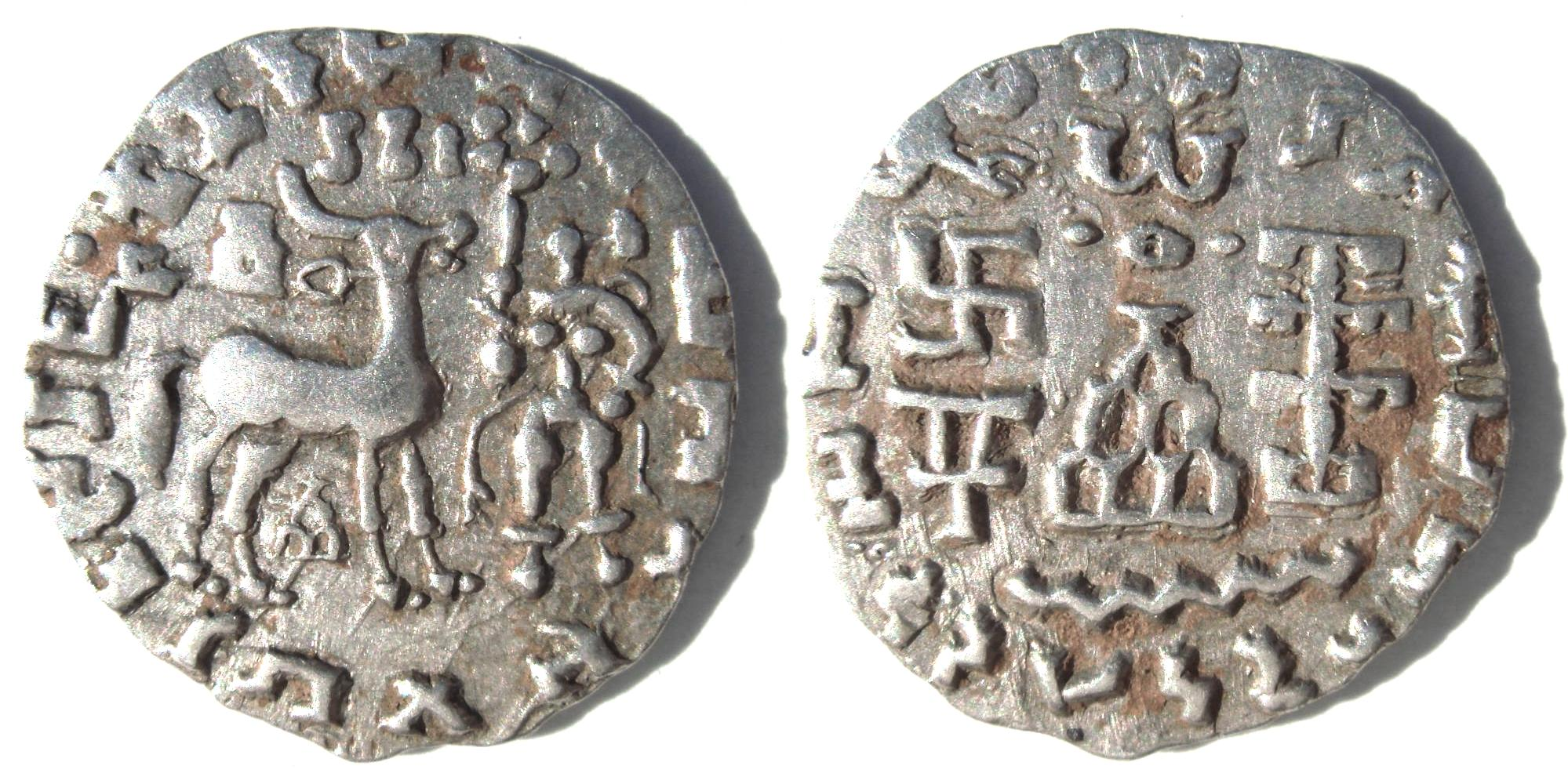
Coin of the Kunindas influenced by Indo-Greek coin styles. 2nd century BCE

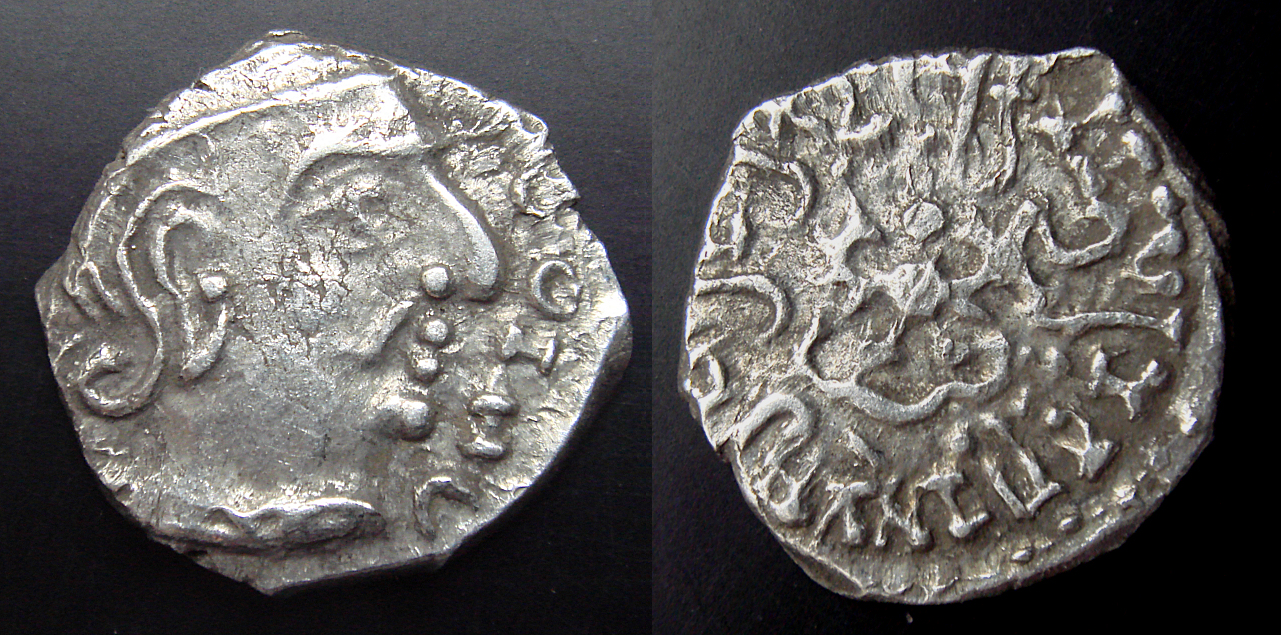
Coin of Gupta Chandragupta II with pseudo-Greek legend in the obverse. 4th century CE

== Greco-Buddhist artistic legacy (1st century BCE – 4th century CE) ==
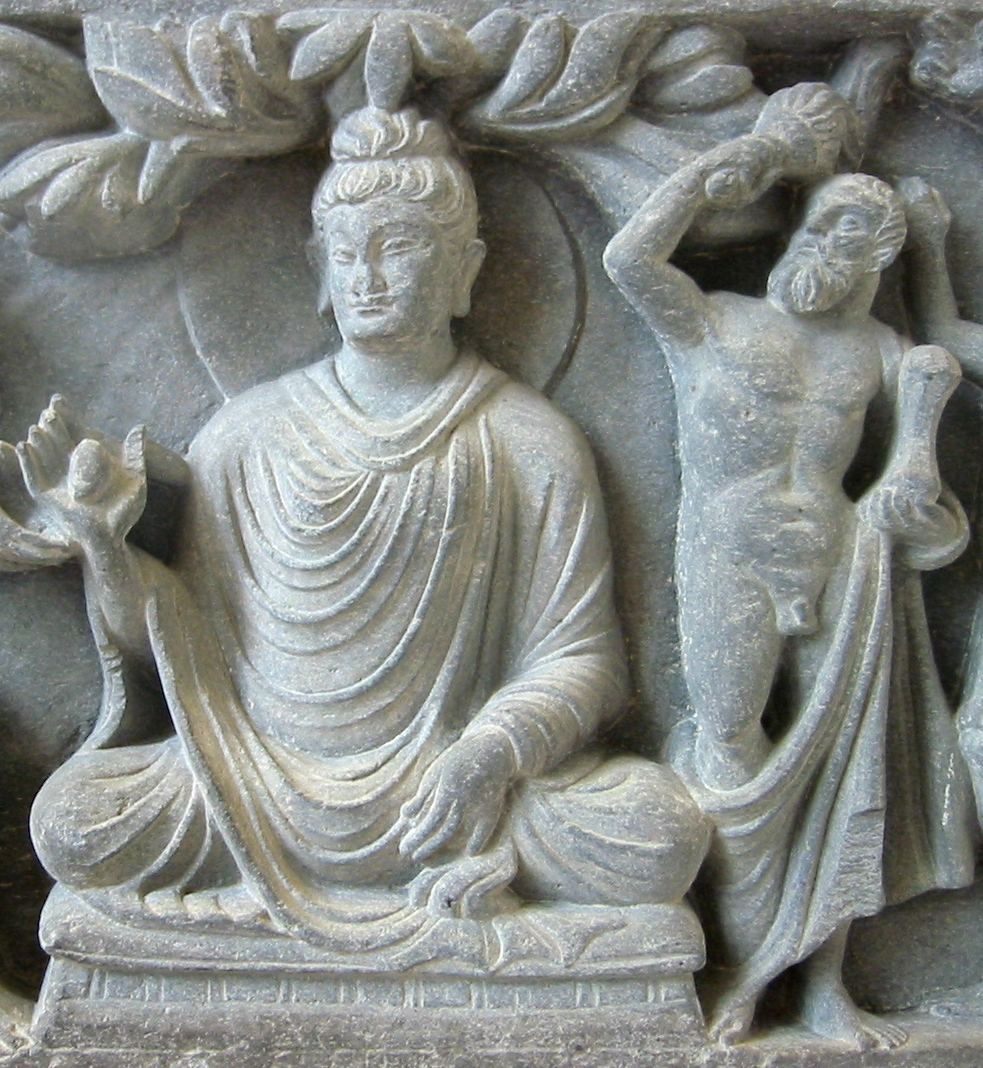
Heracles depiction of Vajrapani as the protector of the Buddha, 2nd century Gandhara, British Museum

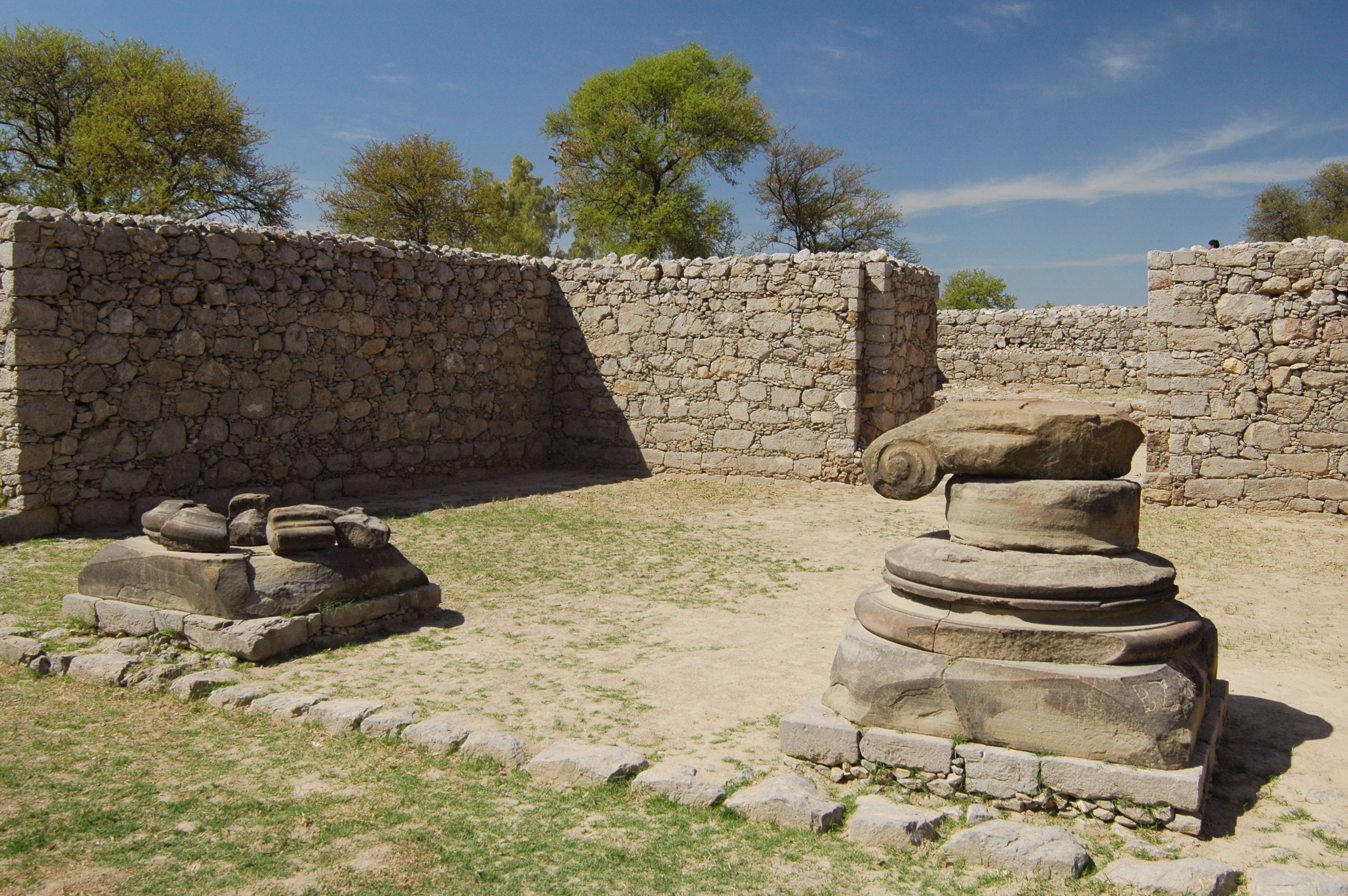
Hellenistic temple with Ionic columns at Jandial, Taxila

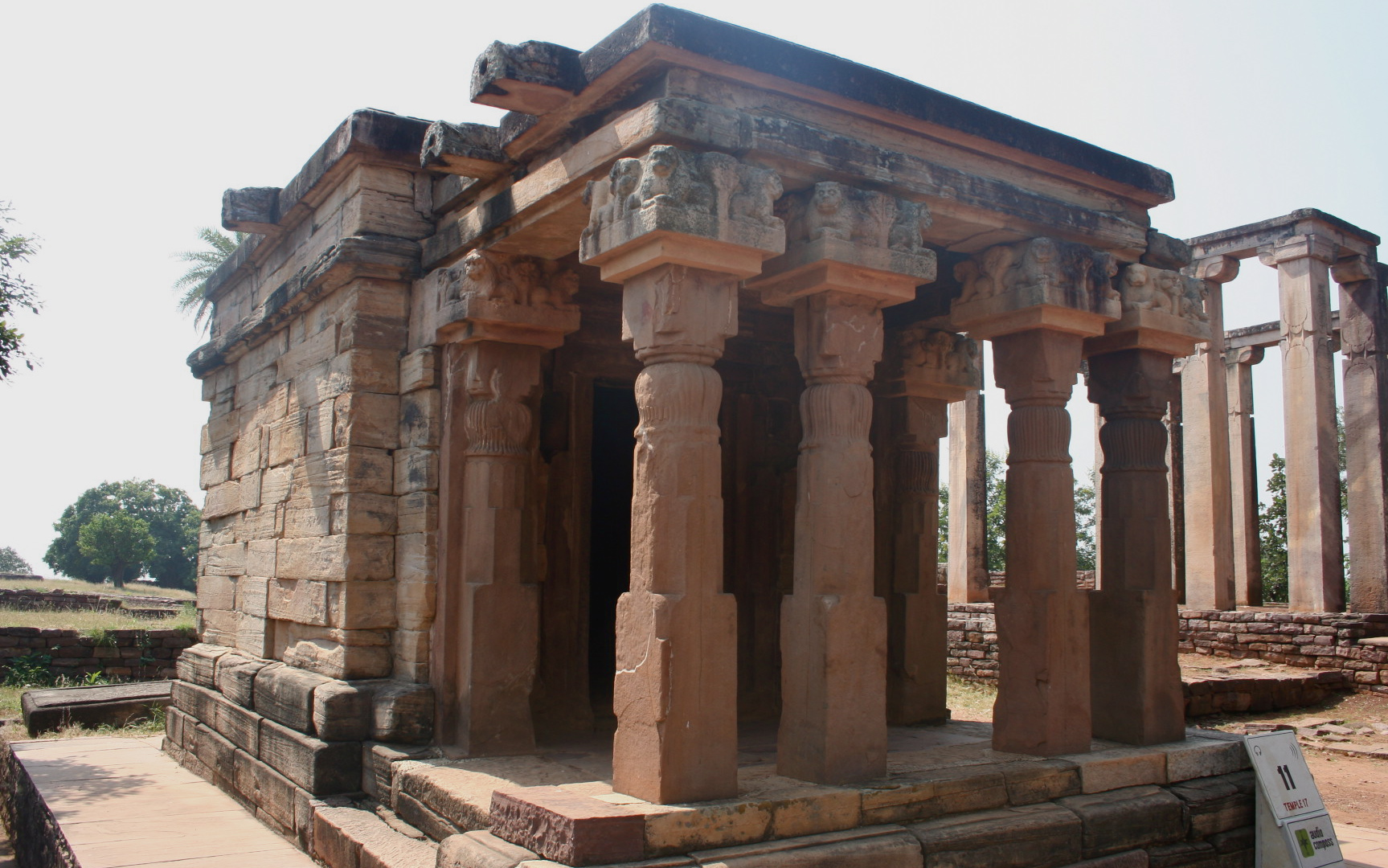
A tetrastyle prostyle early Gupta period temple of almost Classical appearance at Sanchi, an example of Buddhist architecture

The full bloom of Greco-Buddhist art seems to have postdated the Indo-Greek Kingdom, although it has been suggested that individual Greek artisans and artist probably continued to work for the new masters. It is apparently during the rule of the Indo-Scythian, the Indo-Parthian and Kushan that Greco-Buddhist art evolved to become a dominant art form in the northwest of the Indian Subcontinent. Whereas other areas of India, especially the area of Mathura received the influence of the Greco-Buddhist school remains a matter of debate.

== Criticism and Post colonial interpretations ==
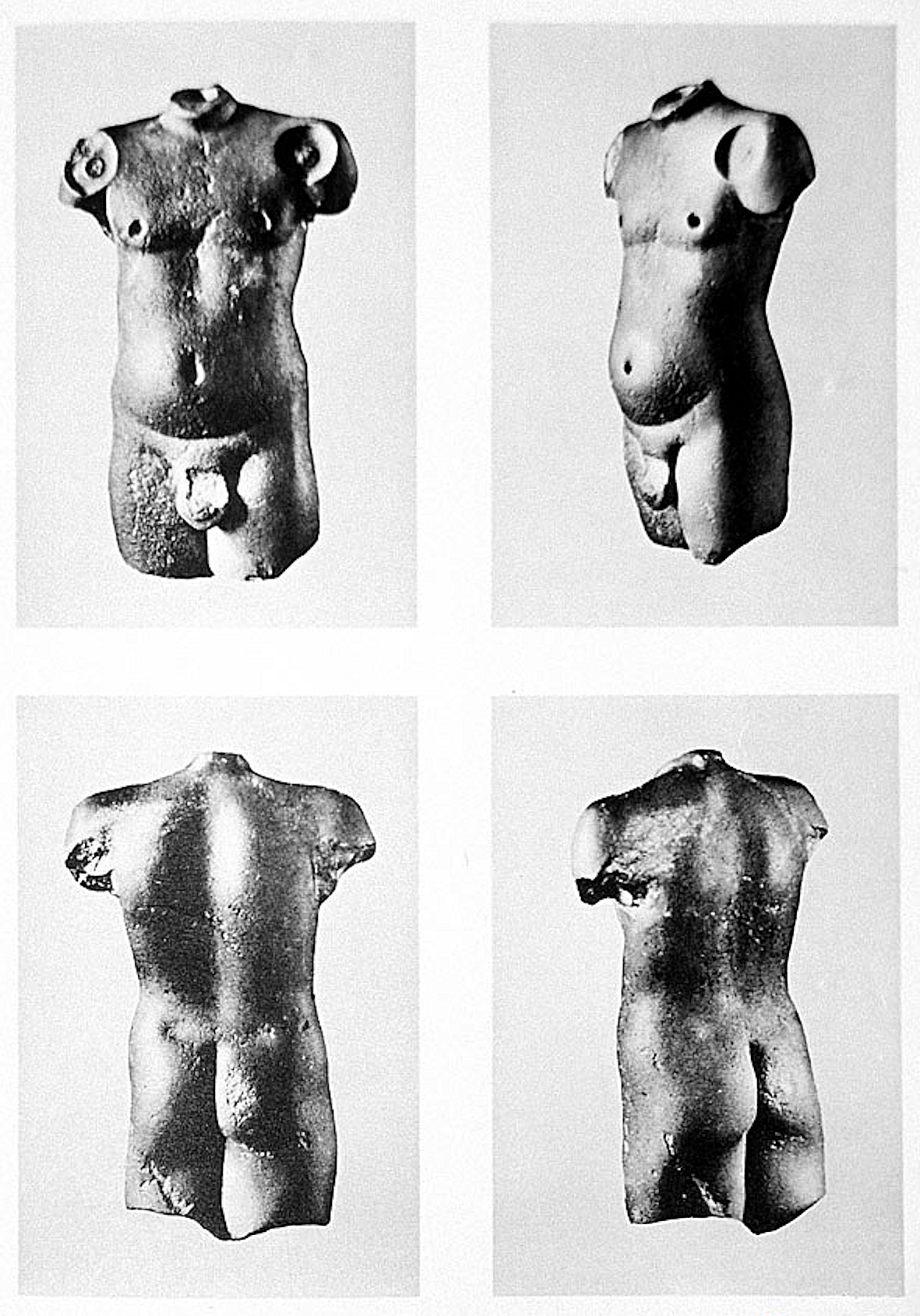
This Bronze Age artifact of Red Jasper torso, despite being excavated from a Harappan mound, was assigned to the historic Gupta period by archaeologist John Marshall because of its classical Greek art appearance.

Many Indian scholars have argued that the notion of Greco-Buddhism, originated by European scholars, goes too far towards relocating Gandharan art as close to Greek and sometimes Persian art and defining ancient Indian art in terms of classical Greco Roman art itself.

The archaeologist John Marshall on his visit to Taxila and Gandhara was reported as stating, 'it seemed as I had lighted on a bit of Greece itself' and I felt then there was something appealingly Greek in the countryside itself'. Pierre Dupont thought of his trip to Pakistan in 1954 as 'a pious trip to the Greco-Buddhist country'. G. W. Leitner coined the term 'Greco-Buddhist' for pieces of Gandharan art which had reached Europe in 1870 and hailed them as a new page in the history of 'Greek art' instead of 'Indian art'.

This view has been challenged by many scholars who argue that anthropomorphic religious figures were already present in Indian art before the arrival of Hellenestic influence, including early images like the Didarganj Yakshi, and local traditions of Anthrophormic monuments which existed independently.

Scholars like Elizabeth Errington have argued that nineteenth- and early twentieth-century European historians often interpreted Gandharan art through colonial and Eurocentric frameworks that privileged Classical Greek aesthetics over indigenous artistic traditions.

Scholars have also criticized earlier interpretations for relying on stylistic comparison without sufficient historical context. Vidya Dehejia notes that religious meaning, patronage, and regional context were often overlooked in favor of formal resemblance.
