= Buner reliefs =

Stone reliefs of the Peshawar Valley, Pakistan

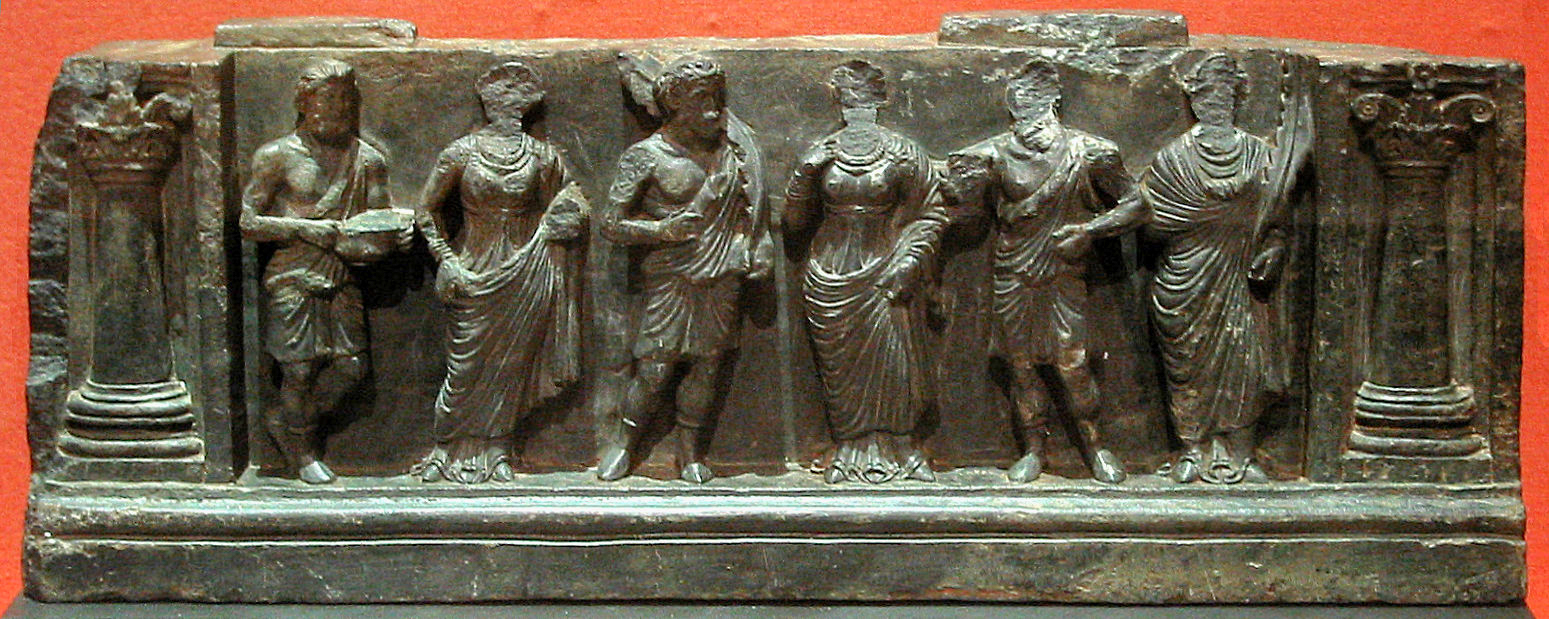
- One of the Buner reliefs, depicting devotees, holding plantain leaves, in purely Hellenistic style, inside Corinthian columns, 1st-2nd century CE. Buner, Swat, Pakistan. Victoria and Albert Museum.
- Discovered: Buner district, ancient Gandhara

Location
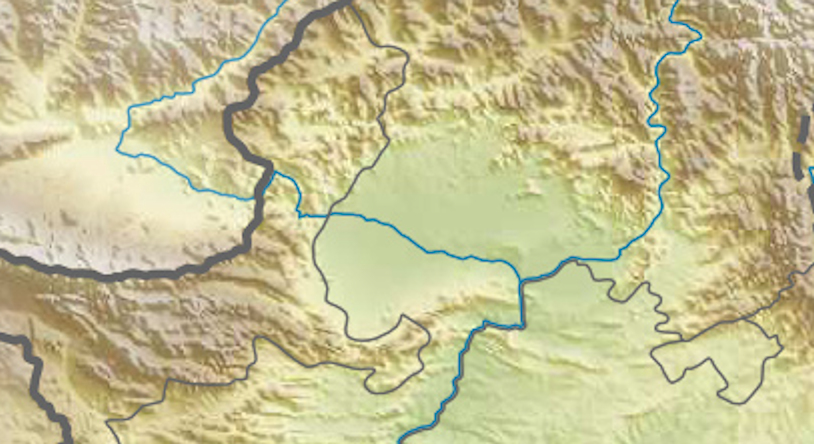

Buner reliefs is a term for a number of stone reliefs in or taken from Buner District, in the Peshawar valley in Pakistan, once in ancient Gandhara. They are also near the Swat Valley.

Most come from Buddhist contexts, but are decorative small-scale architectural sculpture, and many show purely secular scenes, in a style heavily influenced by Hellenistic art.

== Hellenistic scenes ==
Some of the reliefs depict people in Greek dress (the short tunic, or chiton, and the enveloping himation for women, and the short tunic, or exomis, for men) and poses, "often regaling each other with cups, and sometimes pouring from wineskins into cups or mixing bowls in the Greek manner" (Boardman). The characters are often represented alongside columns in the Corinthian style.

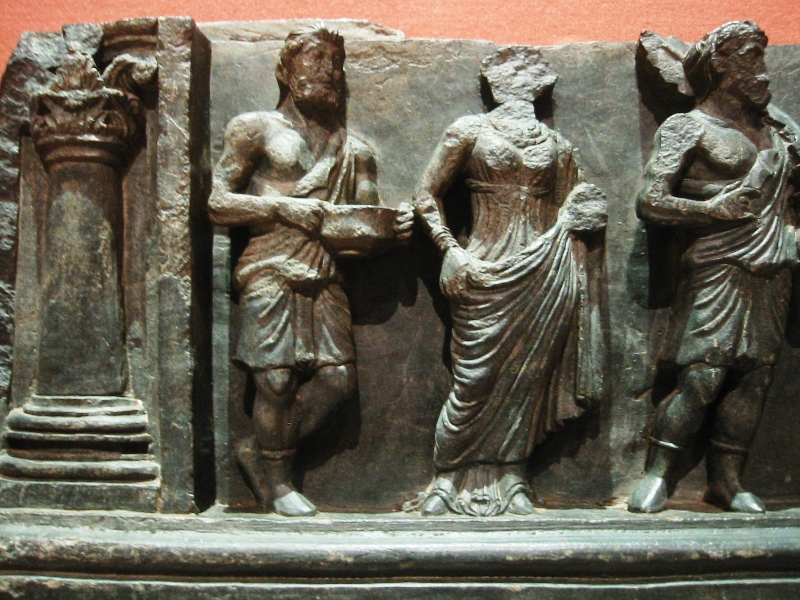
Left detail

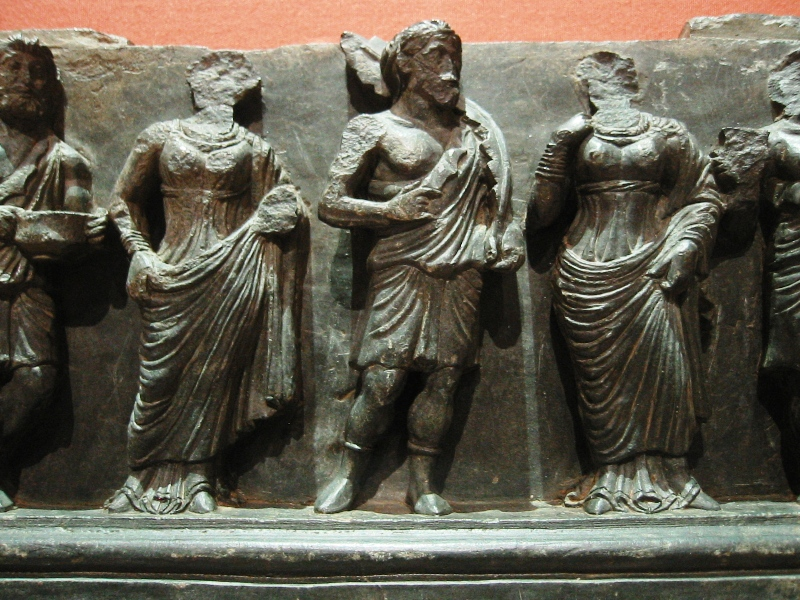
Centre detail

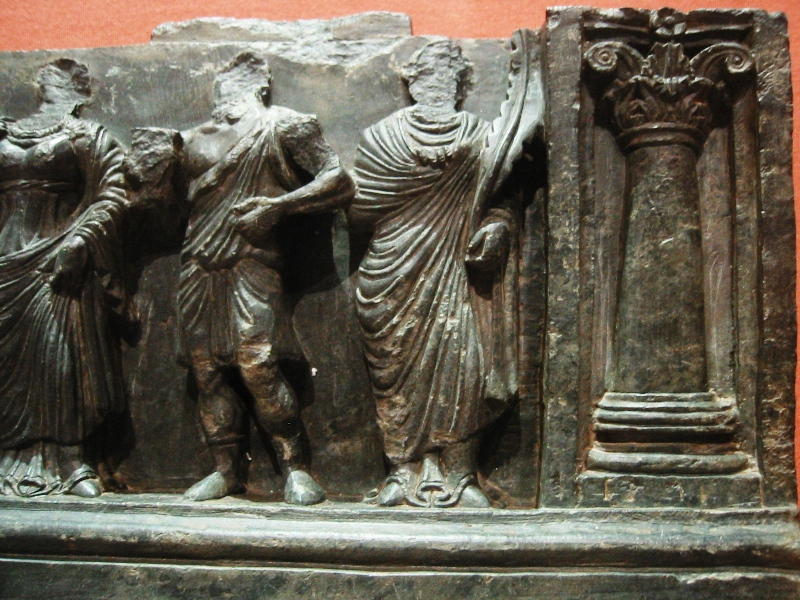
Right detail

== Military scenes ==
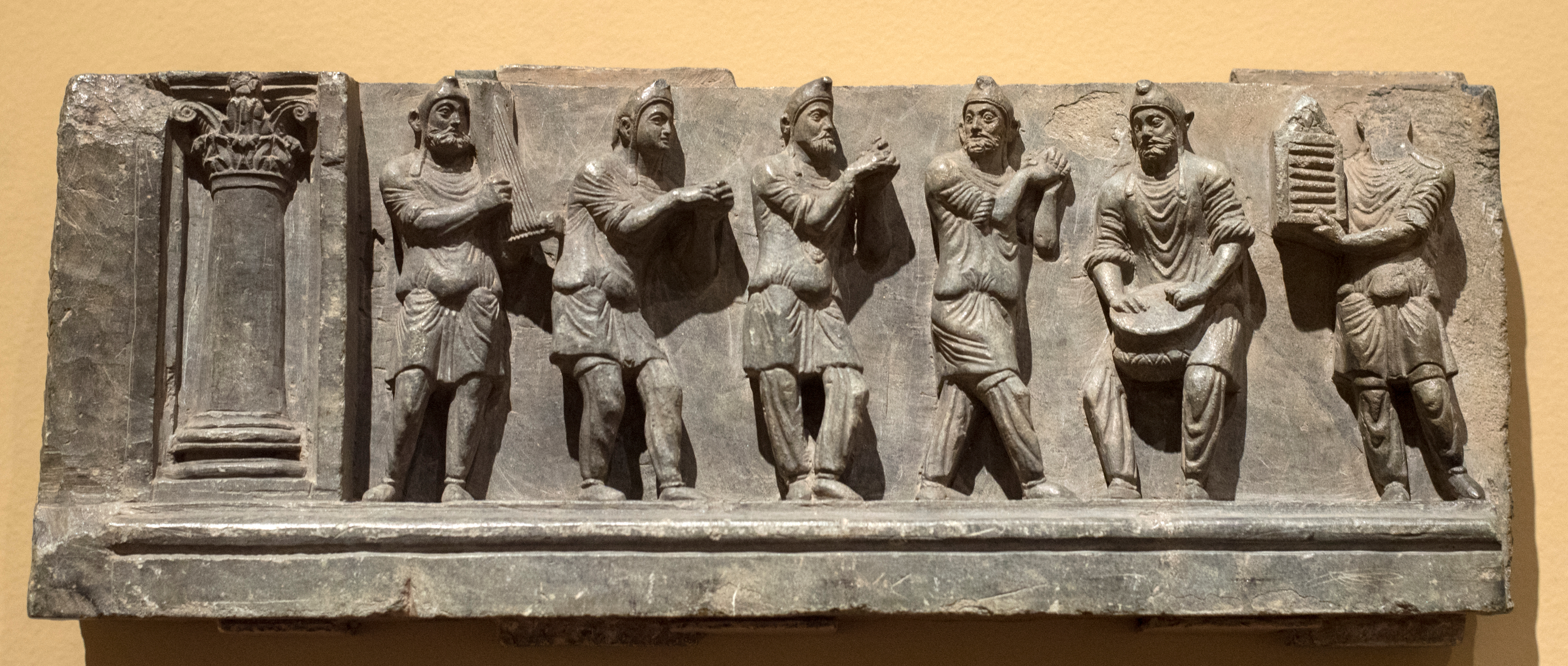
One of the reliefs showing Scythian soldiers dancing. Cleveland Museum of Art.

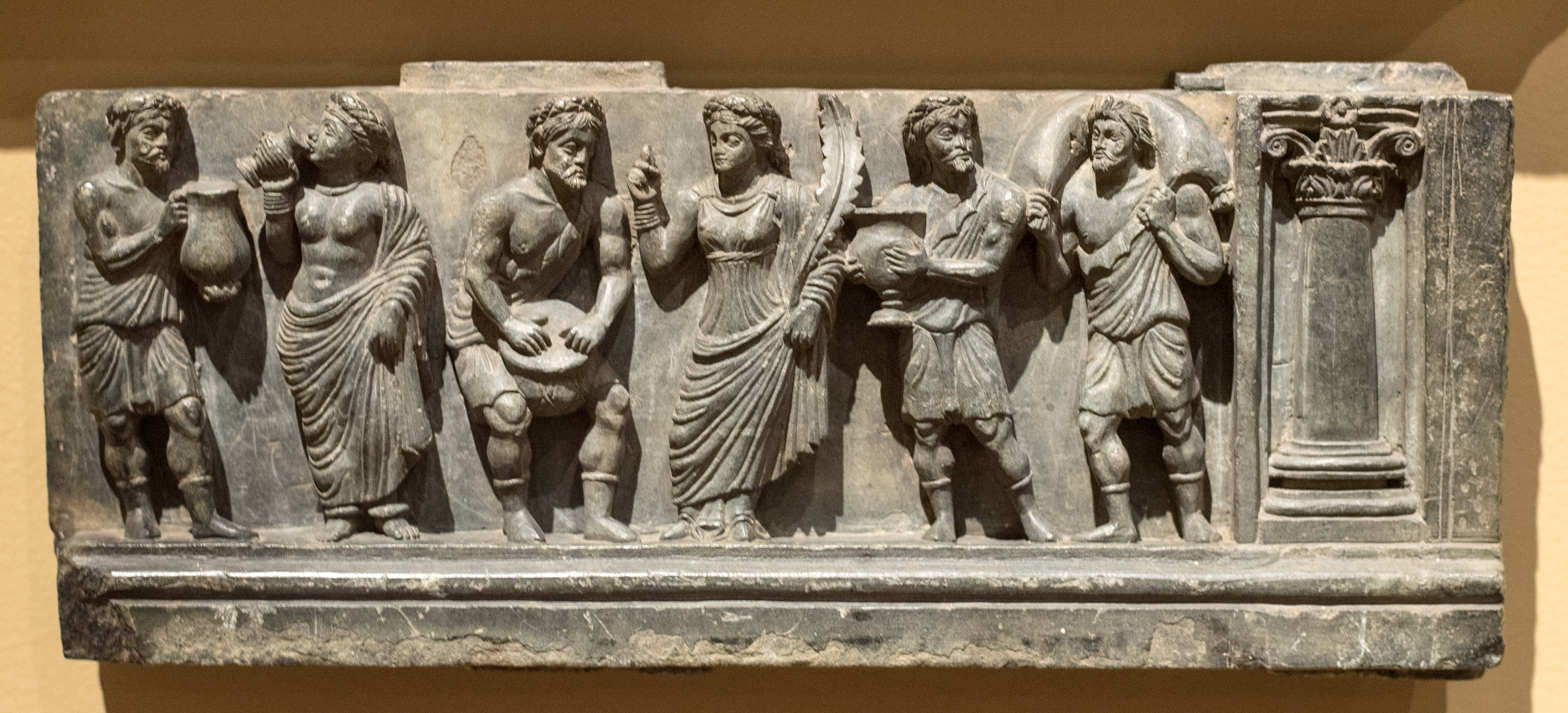
Revelers in Greek dress. Cleveland Museum of Art.

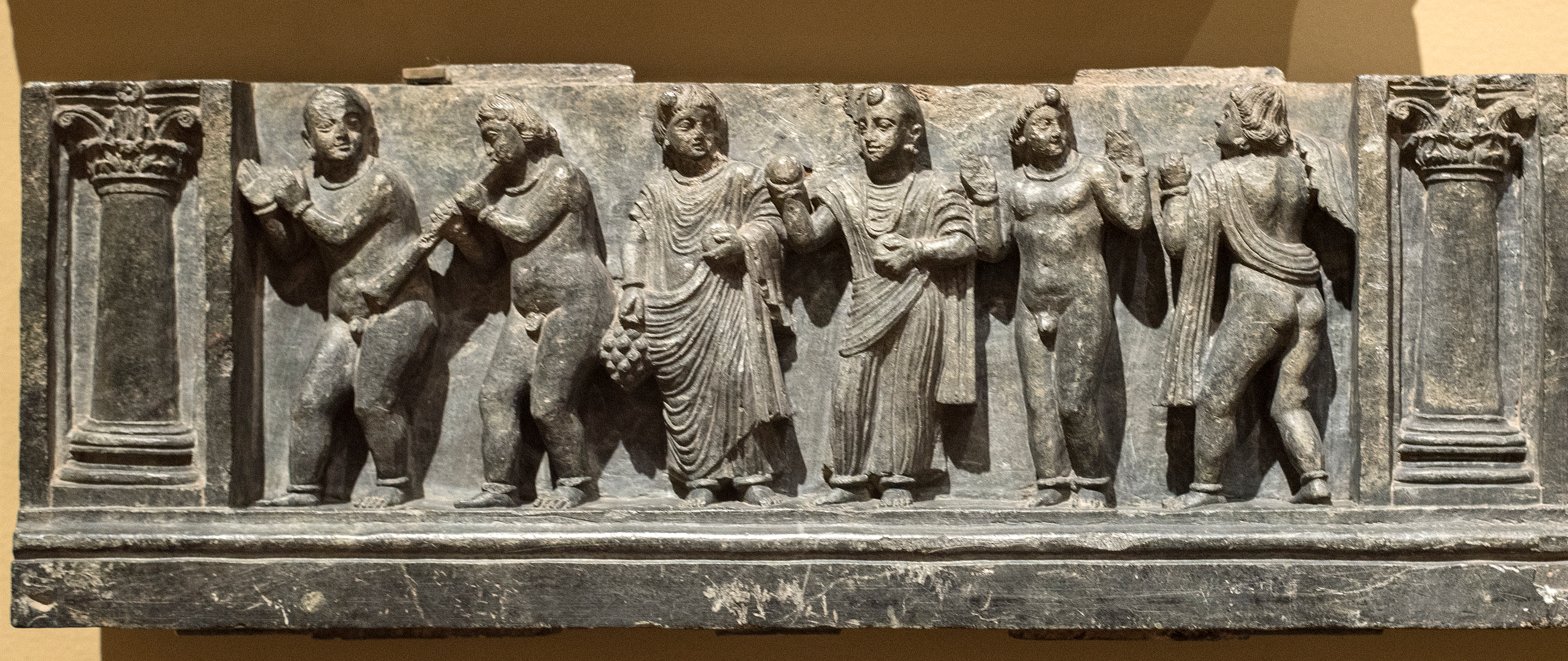
Bacchanalian. Cleveland Museum of Art.

Other reliefs, thought to be contemporary because of their identical style and structure, represent soldiers in military attire. They are depicted in ample tunics with trousers (the anaxyride), with a pointed hood and heavy straight sword as a weapon. With the right hand, some of them are forming the Karana mudra against evil spirits. In Gandhara, such friezes were used as decorations on the piedestals of Buddhist stupas. These soldiers could be Indo-Scythians, or possibly Phrygian troops from the Hellenistic realm.

Another relief is known where the same type of soldiers are dancing and playing musical instruments. The instruments are a small harp, a hand drum and a small portable xylophone. Three of the men are dancing, clasping both hands together.

== Buddhist scenes ==
Again other reliefs show people in Indian dress, typically holding lotus flowers.

All of these friezes, being contemporary with each other, hint at an intermixing of Indo-Scythians (holding military power), Indo-Greeks (confined, under Indo-Scythian rule, to civilian life, and usually shown revelling with drinking cups) and Buddhists (possibly most directly involved in religious matters, and shown with the reverencial lotus).

These reliefs usually belonged to Buddhist temples, where they were used as stair-risers, or thresholds to niches on Buddhist monuments. In addition to the Greek costumes depicted in them, the artwork of the reliefs is Hellenistic in style and content; they are considered some of the earliest examples of Greco-Buddhist art. They are usually dated to around the 1st century CE, although they might go back to the 1st century BCE, thus corresponding to the period of Indo-Greek and Indo-Scythian rule in ancient India.

One of the most famous of these reliefs is the one located in the Victoria and Albert Museum.

== Other possible Buner reliefs ==
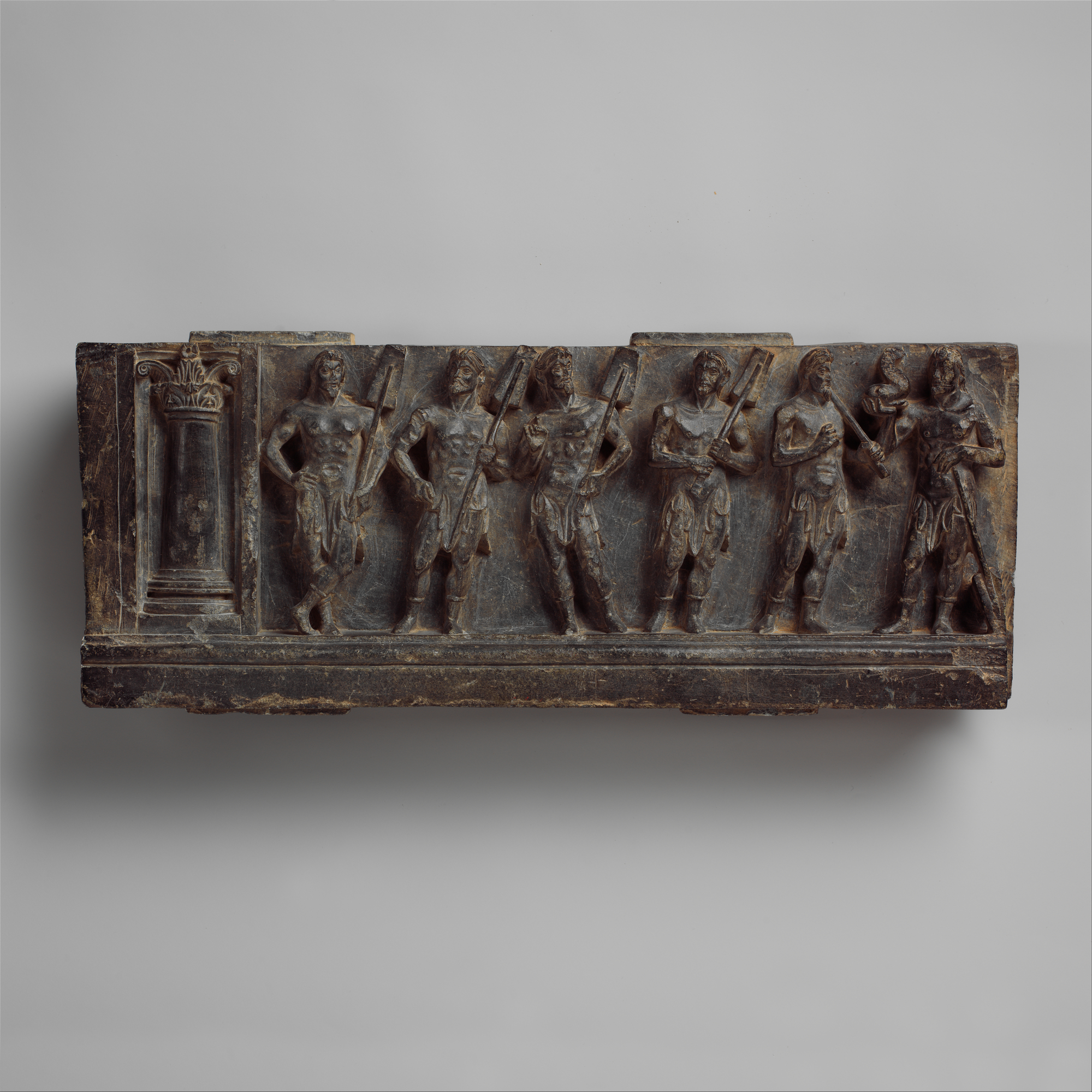

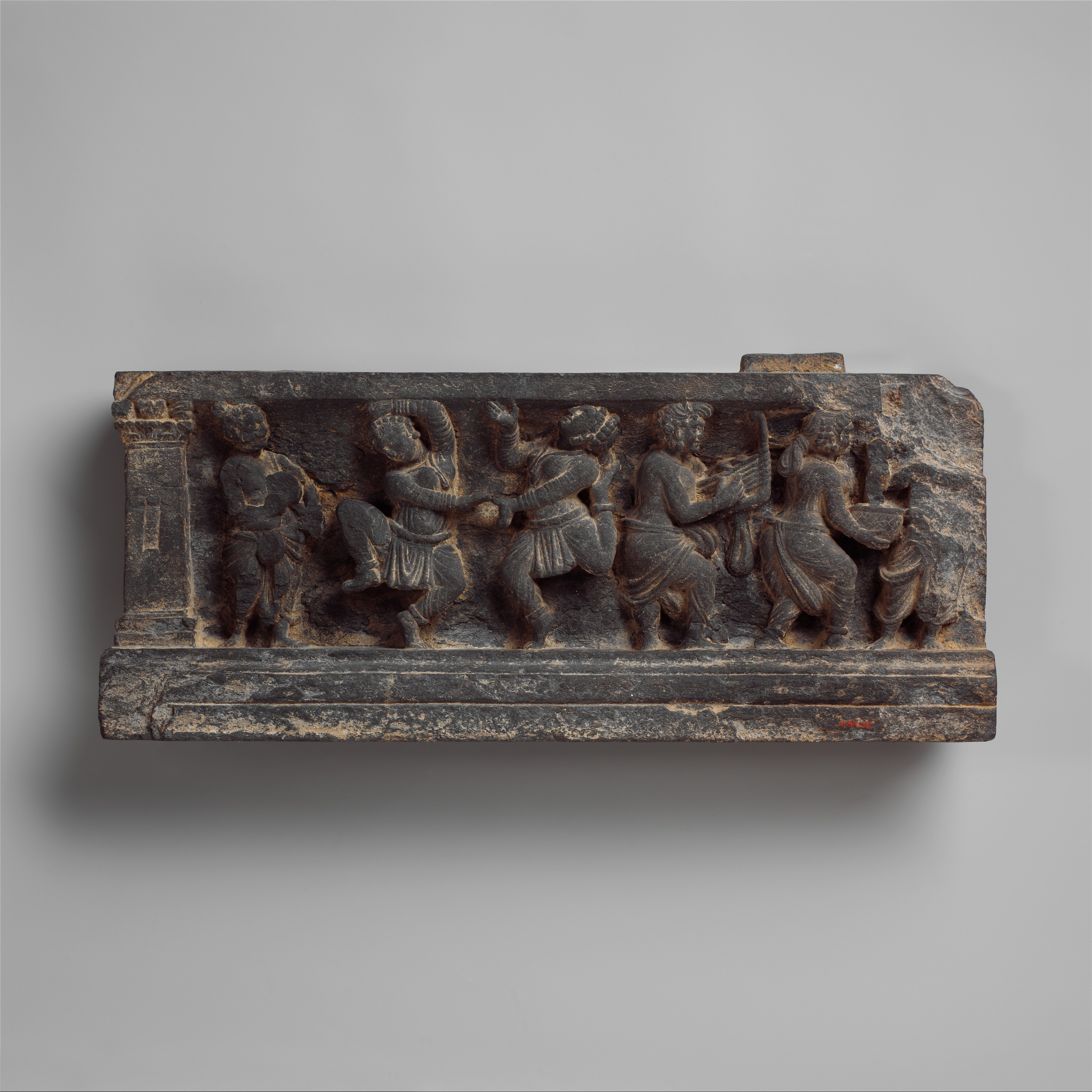

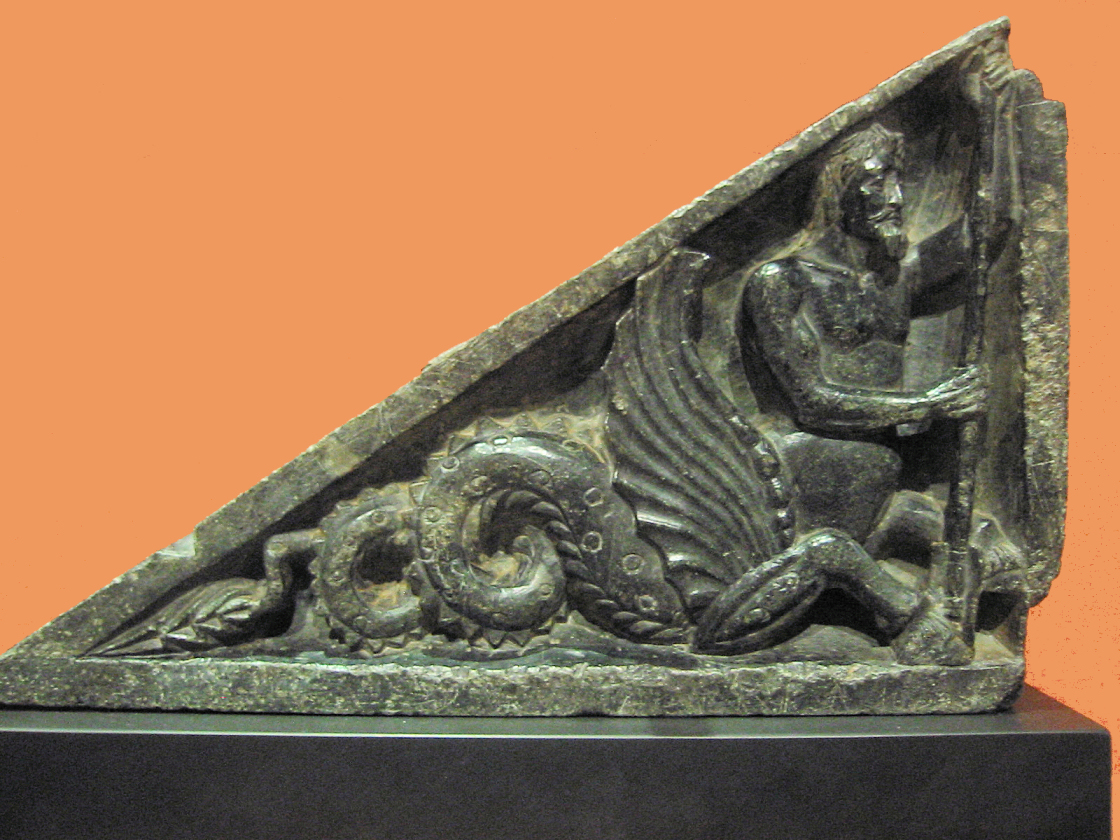
A stair riser depicting an ichthyocentaur, one of the Buner reliefs. Victoria and Albert Museum
