= Afghanistan–Greece relations =

- Afghanistan: Greece

Diplomatic mission
- Afghan Embassy, Athens: Greek Embassy, Islamabad, Pakistan

Diplomatic relations between Afghanistan and Greece have existed for centuries, though the August 2021 Taliban takeover of the country has dampened relations.

== History ==
=== Early relations ===
The first contact between Greece and Afghanistan occurred in 330 BC when Alexander the Great entered the territory of modern-day Afghanistan. While there, Alexander founded several modern day Afghan cities such as Alexandria Arachosia (present day Kandahar), Alexandria Ariana (present day Herat), Alexandria on the Oxus (Ai-Khanoum) and Alexandria in Opiana (present day Ghazni). Alexander also encountered Greek-speaking Branchidae people who migrated from Miletus to Afghanistan by order of Xerxes I with whom they sided with. Nearly a hundred years after the death of Alexander, the Greco-Bactrian Kingdom and Indo-Greek Kingdom were founded in Afghanistan by descendants of Greeks who had settled in the area.

The Kandahar Greek Edicts of Ashoka, which are among the Major Rock Edicts of the Indian Emperor Ashoka were written in Greek. They were found in the Old Kandahar. Also, the Kandahar Sophytos Inscription is an inscription in Greek made by Sophytos, son of Naratos, in the 2nd century BCE, in the city of Kandahar.

After the collapse of the Greek kingdoms in Afghanistan, there would be almost non-existent contact between Afghanistan and Greece until the Ottoman–Hotaki War from 1722 to 1727 when the Ottoman Empire (which Greece was part of at the time) fought against Afghan troops to obtain control of all western and northwestern parts of modern-day Iran.

=== Modern relations ===
Greece donated funds to increase security at the National Museum of Afghanistan in 1993 and 1996. They later offered to buy some items and/or store them in Greece for safekeeping, as well as sent funds and experts to help with restoration after the United States invasion of Afghanistan.

In 2001, Greece, as a member of NATO joined the International Security Assistance Force and sent troops to fight in the War in Afghanistan to combat the Taliban and Al-Qaeda.

In 2004, Afghanistan and Greece officially establish diplomatic relations. In December 2017, Afghanistan opened an embassy in Athens, its first ever diplomatic mission in Greece.

== Bilateral relations ==
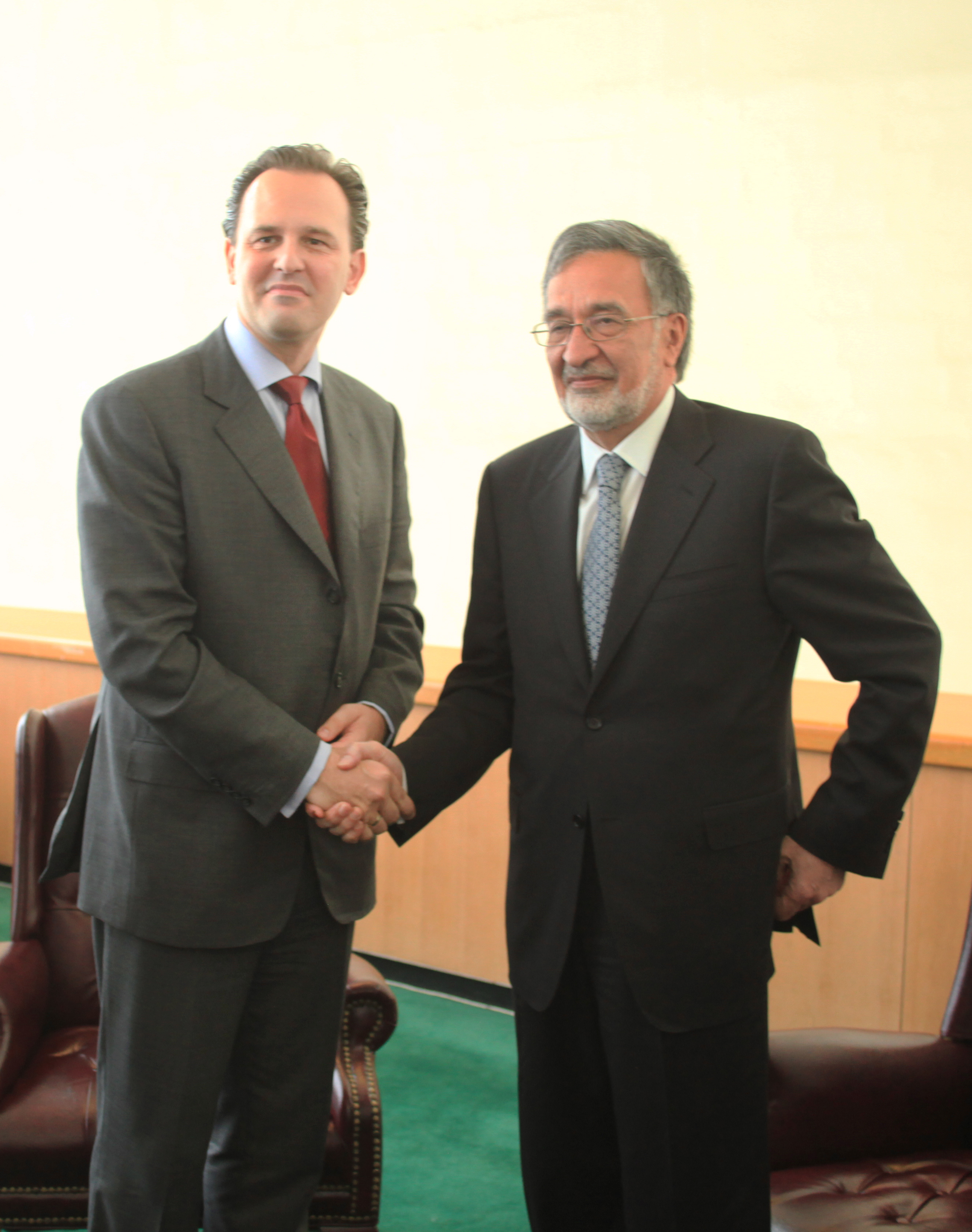
Greek Foreign Minister Dimitrios Droutsas meeting with Afghan Foreign Minister Zalmai Rassoul in 2010.

Throughout the years, both nations have signed some bilateral agreements such as an agreement for the establishment of political representation between the two countries (which provides further opportunities for expansion of friendly relations and bilateral cooperation between Afghanistan and Greece). On a yearly basis, Greece provides scholarships for Afghan students in the field of archeology, and for demining training.

== Migration ==
Since the war in Afghanistan began in 2001, there have been an increase in Afghan migration to Greece. As the situation in Afghanistan worsened, thousands of Afghan refugees have entered Greece and sought asylum, however, the majority of migrants in Greece are passing through to other European countries. In 2016, there were approximately 10,000 - 15,000 Afghans residing in Greece, the majority of them with temporary asylum documents and living in refugee camps such as Diavata refugee camp and in others throughout the country. Approximately 2,000 Afghans have settled and are living in Greece, most of them in Athens.

== Resident diplomatic missions ==
- Afghanistan has an embassy in Athens.
- Greece is accredited to Afghanistan from its embassy in Islamabad, Pakistan.

== See also ==
- Diavata refugee camp
- Immigration to Greece
