= Kandahar Greek Edicts of Ashoka =

Edict of the Mauryan emperor Ashoka in Afghanistan

Coordinates: 31°36′09″N 65°39′32″E

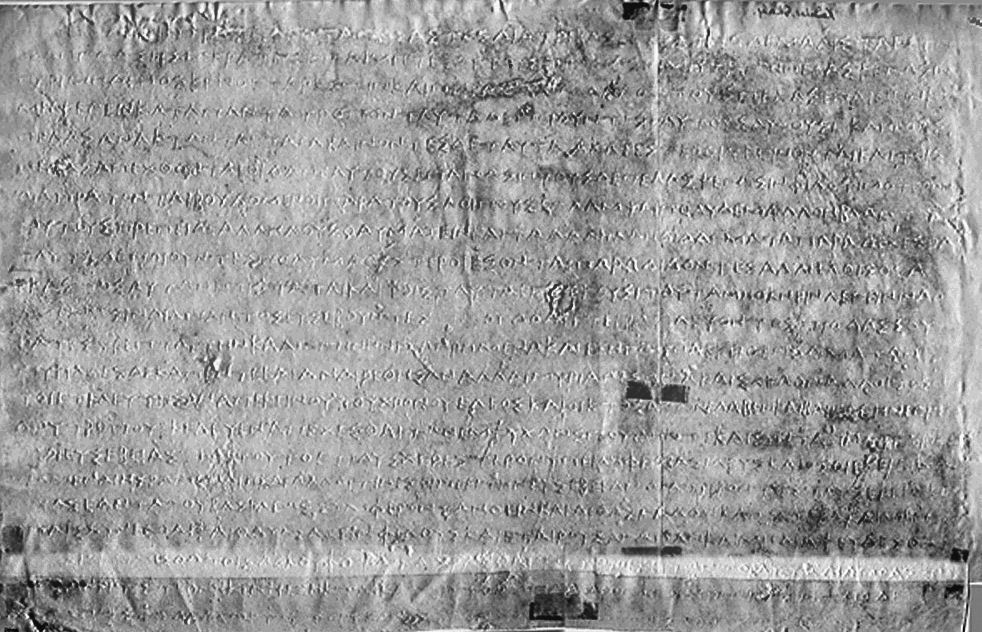
- Greek inscription by king Ashoka, discovered in Kandahar
- Material: Sandstone tablet
- Size: 45 by 69.5 centimetres (17.7 in × 27.4 in)
- Writing: Greek
- Created: circa 258 BCE
- Period/culture: 3rd Century BCE
- Discovered: 31°36′09N 65°39′32E
- Place: Old Kandahar, Kandahar, Afghanistan

Location of the Kandahar Greek Inscription in Afghanistan.

The Kandahar Greek Edicts of Ashoka are among the Major Rock Edicts of the Indian Emperor Ashoka (r. 269–233 BCE) written in Greek and Prakrit . They were found in the ancient area of Old Kandahar in Afghanistan 1963. It is thought that Old Kandahar was founded in the 4th century BCE by Alexander the Great, who named it Alexandria of Arachosia.

The extant edicts are found in a plaque of limestone, which probably belonged to a building, and its size is 45 by 69.5 centimetres (17.7 in × 27.4 in) and it is about 12 centimetres (4.7 in) thick. These are the only Ashoka inscriptions thought to have belonged to a stone building. The beginning and the end of the fragment are lacking, which suggests the inscription was original significantly longer, and may have included all 14 of Ashoka's Edicts in Greek, as in several other locations in India. The plaque with the inscription was bought in the Kandahar market by the German doctor Seyring, and French archaeologists found that it had been excavated in Old Kandahar. The plaque was then offered to the Kabul Museum, but its current location is unknown following the looting of the museum in 1992–1994.

== Background ==
Greek communities lived in the northwest of the Mauryan empire, currently in Pakistan, notably ancient Gandhara near the current Pakistani capital of Islamabad and in the region of Gedrosia, and presently in Southern Afghanistan, following the conquest and the colonization efforts of Alexander the Great around 323 BCE. These communities therefore were significant in the area of Afghanistan during the reign of Ashoka.

== Content ==
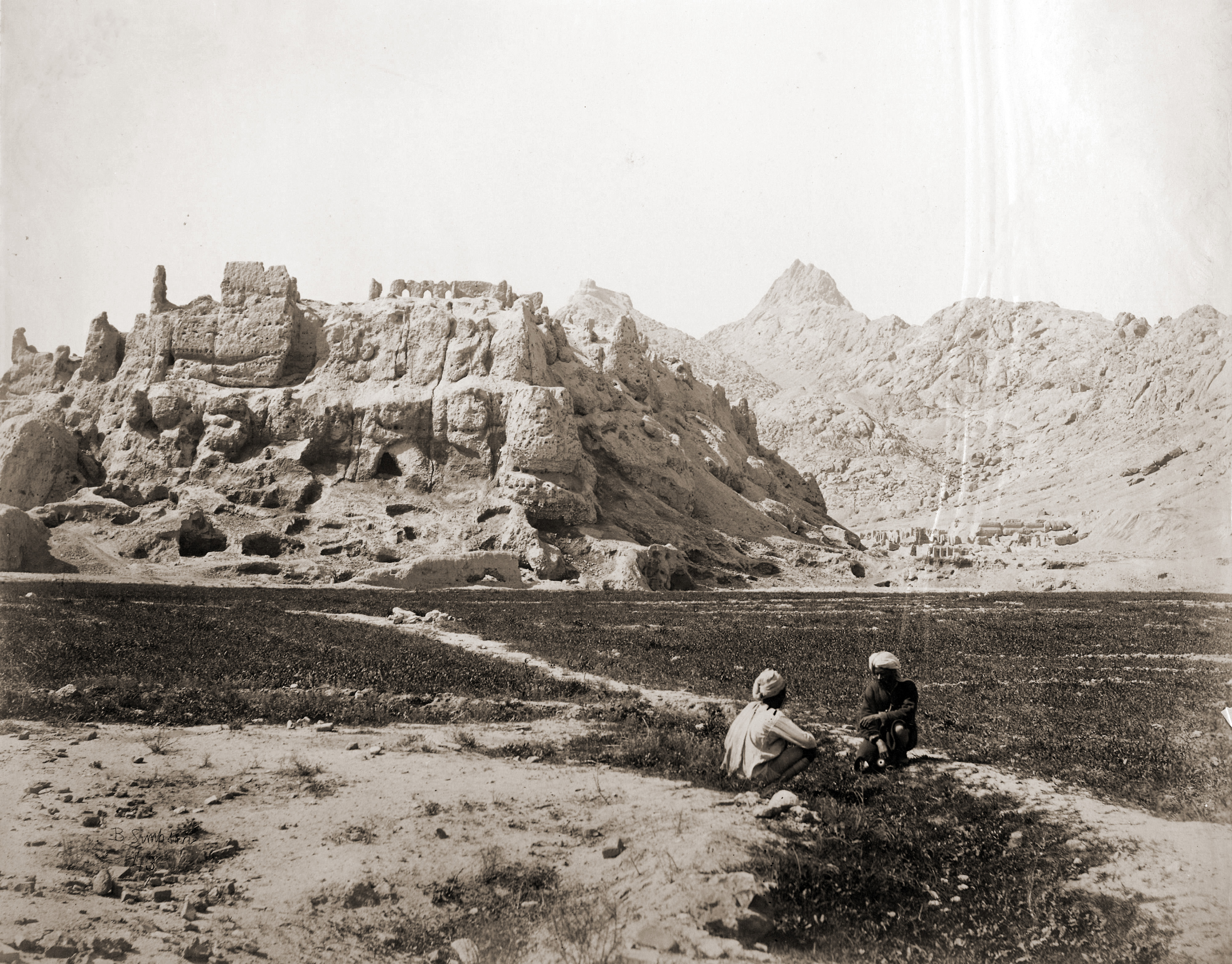
An 1881 photo showing the ruined Old Kandahar citadel ("Zor Shar") where the Greek inscription was discovered

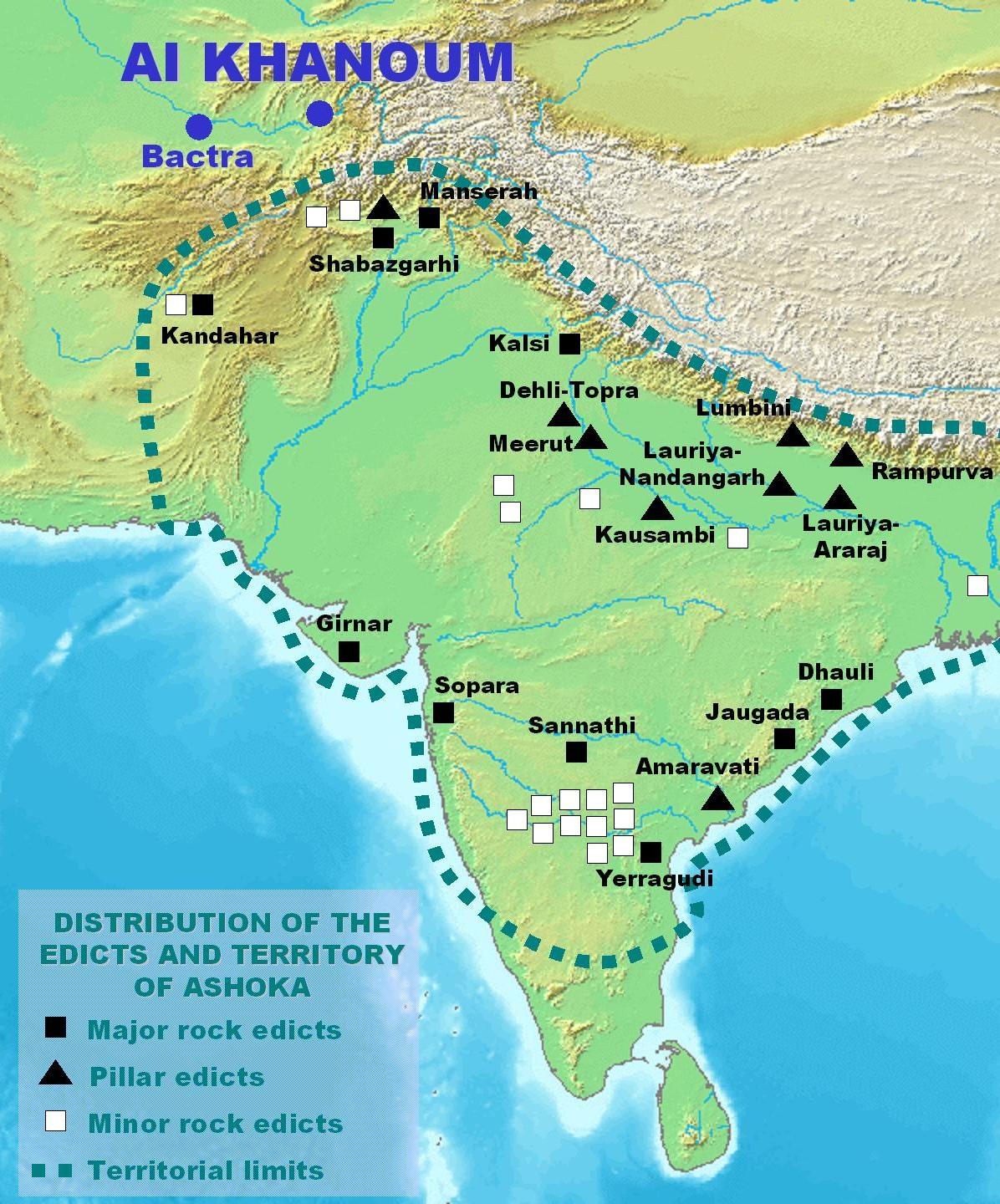
The Kandahar Greek Inscription was located at the edge of the Indian realm, near the border with the Greco-Bactrian kingdom and Ai-Khanoum.

The Edict is a Greek version of the end of the 12th Edict (which describes moral precepts) and the beginning of the 13th Edict (which describes the King's remorse and conversion after the war in Kalinga), which makes it a portion of a Major Rock Edict. This inscription does not use another language in parallel, contrary to the famous Kandahar Bilingual Rock Inscription in Greek language and Aramaic, discovered in the same general area.

The Greek language used in the inscription is of a very high level and displays philosophical refinement. It also displays an in-depth understanding of the political language of the Hellenic world in the 3rd century BCE. This suggests the presence of a highly cultured Greek presence in Kandahar at that time.

== Implications ==
The proclamation of this edict in Kandahar is usually taken as proof that Ashoka had control over that part of Afghanistan, presumably after Seleucus I had ceded this territory to Chandragupta Maurya in their 305 BCE peace agreement. The Edict also shows the presence of a sizable Greek population in the area where great efforts were made to convert them to Buddhism. At the same epoch, the Greeks were established in the Greco-Bactrian kingdom, and particularly in the border city of Ai-Khanoum, in the northern part of Afghanistan.

== Translation ==
Kandahar Greek Edict of Ashoka
English translation	Original Greek text
(End of Edict No 12) "...piety and self-mastery in all the schools of thought; and he who is master of his tongue is most master of himself. And let them neither praise themselves or disparage their neighbors in any matter whatsoever, for that is vain. In acting in accordance with this principle, they exalt themselves and win their neighbors; in transgressing in these things they misdemean themselves and antagonize their neighbors. Those who praise themselves and denigrate their neighbors are self-seekers, wishing to shine in comparison with the others but in fact hurting themselves. It behoves to respect one another and to accept one another's lessons. In all actions it behoves to be understanding, sharing with one another all that which one comprehends. And to those who strive thus let there be no hesitation to say these things in order that they may persist in piety in everything. (Beginning of Edict No 13); In the eighth of the reign of Piodasses, he conquered Kalinga. A hundred and fifty thousand persons were captured and deported, and a hundred thousand others were killed, and almost as many died otherwise. Thereafter, piety and compassion seized him and he suffered grieviously. In the same manner wherewith he ordered abstention from living thing, he has displayed zeal and effort to promote piety. And at the same time the king has viewed this with displeasure: of Brahmins and Sramins and others practicing piety who live there [in Kalinga]- and these must be mindful of the interests of the king and must revere and respect their teacher, their father and their mother, and love and faithfully cherish their friends and companions and must use their slaves and dependents as gently as possible - if, of those thus engaged there, any has died or been deported and the rest have regarded this lightly, the king has taken it with exceeding bad grace. And that amongst other people there are..." — Translation by R.E.M. Wheeler.	1. [.εὐ]σέβεια καὶ ἐγκράτεια κατὰ πάσας τὰς διατριβάς· ἐγκρατὴς δὲ μάλιστά ἐστιν 2. ὃς ἂν γλώσης ἐγκρατὴς ἦι. Καὶ μήτε ἑαυτοὺς ἐπα[ι]νῶσιν, μήτε τῶν πέλας ψέγωσιν 3. περὶ μηδενός· κενὸγ γάρ ἐστιν· καὶ πειρᾶσθαι μᾶλλον τοὺς πέλας ἐπαινεῖν καὶ 4. μὴ ψέγειν κατὰ πάντα τρόπον. Ταῦτα δὲ ποιοῦντες ἑαυτοὺς αὔξουσι καὶ τοὺς 5. πέλας ἀνακτῶνται· παραβαίνοντες δὲ ταῦτα, ἀκ(λ)εέστεροί τε γίνονται καὶ τοῖς 6. πέλας ἀπέχθονται. Οἳ δ’ ἂν ἑαυτοὺς ἐπαινῶσιν, τοὺς δὲ πέλας ψέγωσιν φιλοτιμότερον 7. διαπράτονται, βουλόμενοι παρὰ τοὺς λοιποὺς ἐγλάμψαι, πολὺ δὲ μᾶλλον βλάπτου[σι]; 8. ἑαυτούς. Πρέπει δὲ ἀλλήλους θαυμάζειν καὶ τὰ ἀλλήλων διδάγματα παραδέχεσθα[ι].; 9. Ταῦτα δὲ ποιοῦντες πολυμαθέστεροι ἔσονται, παραδιδόντες ἀλλήλοις ὅσα 10. ἕκαστος αὐτῶν ἐπίσταται. Καὶ τοῖς ταῦτα ἐπ[α]σκοῦσι ταῦτα μὴ ὀκνεῖν λέγειν ἵνα δει-; 11. αμείνωσιν διὰ παντὸς εὐσεβοῦντες. Ὀγδόωι ἔτει βασιλεύοντος Πιοδάσσου; 12. κατέστρ(α)πται τὴν Καλίγγην. Ἦν ἐζωγρημένα καὶ ἐξηγμένα ἐκεῖθεν σωμάτων 13. μυριάδες δεκαπέντε καὶ ἀναιρέθησαν ἄλλαι μυριάδες δέκα καὶ σχεδὸν ἄλλοι τοσοῦ-; 14. τοι ἐτελεύτησαν. Ἀπ’ ἐκείνου τοῦ χρόνου ἔλεος καὶ οἶκτος αὐτὸν ἔλαβεν· καὶ βαρέως ἤνεγκεν·; 15. δι’ οὗ τρόπου ἐκέλευεν ἀπέχεσθαι τῶν ἐμψύχων σπουδήν τε καὶ σύντα(σ)ιν πεποίηται 16. περὶ εὐσεβείας. Καὶ τοῦτο ἔτι δυσχερέστερον ὑπείληφε ὁ βασιλεύς· καὶ ὅσοι ἐκεῖ ωἴκουν 17. βραμεναι ἢ σραμεναι ἢ καὶ ἄλλοι τινὲς οἱ περὶ τὴν εὐσέβειαν διατρίβοντες, τοὺς ἐκεῖ οἰκοῦ-; 18. ντας ἔδει τὰ τοῦ βασιλέως συμφέροντα νοεῖν, καὶ διδάσκαλον καὶ πατέρα καὶ μητέρα 19. ἐπαισχύνεσθαι καὶ θαυμάζειν, φίλους καὶ ἑταίρους ἀγαπᾶν καὶ μὴ διαψεύδεσθαι, 20. δούλοις καὶ μισθωτοῖς ὡς κουφότατα χρᾶσθαι, τούτων ἐκεῖ τῶν τοιαῦτα διαπρασσο-; 21. μένων εἴ τις τέθνηκεν ἢ ἐξῆκται, καὶ τοῦτο ἐμ παραδρομῆι οἱ λοιποὶ ἥγεινται, ὁ δὲ 22. [β]ασιλεὺς σφόδρα ἐπὶ τούτοις ἐδυσχέρανεν. Καὶ ὅτι ἐν τοῖς λοιποῖς ἔθνεσίν εἰσιν; — Transliteration by Daniel Schlumberger.

== Other inscriptions in Greek in Kandahar ==
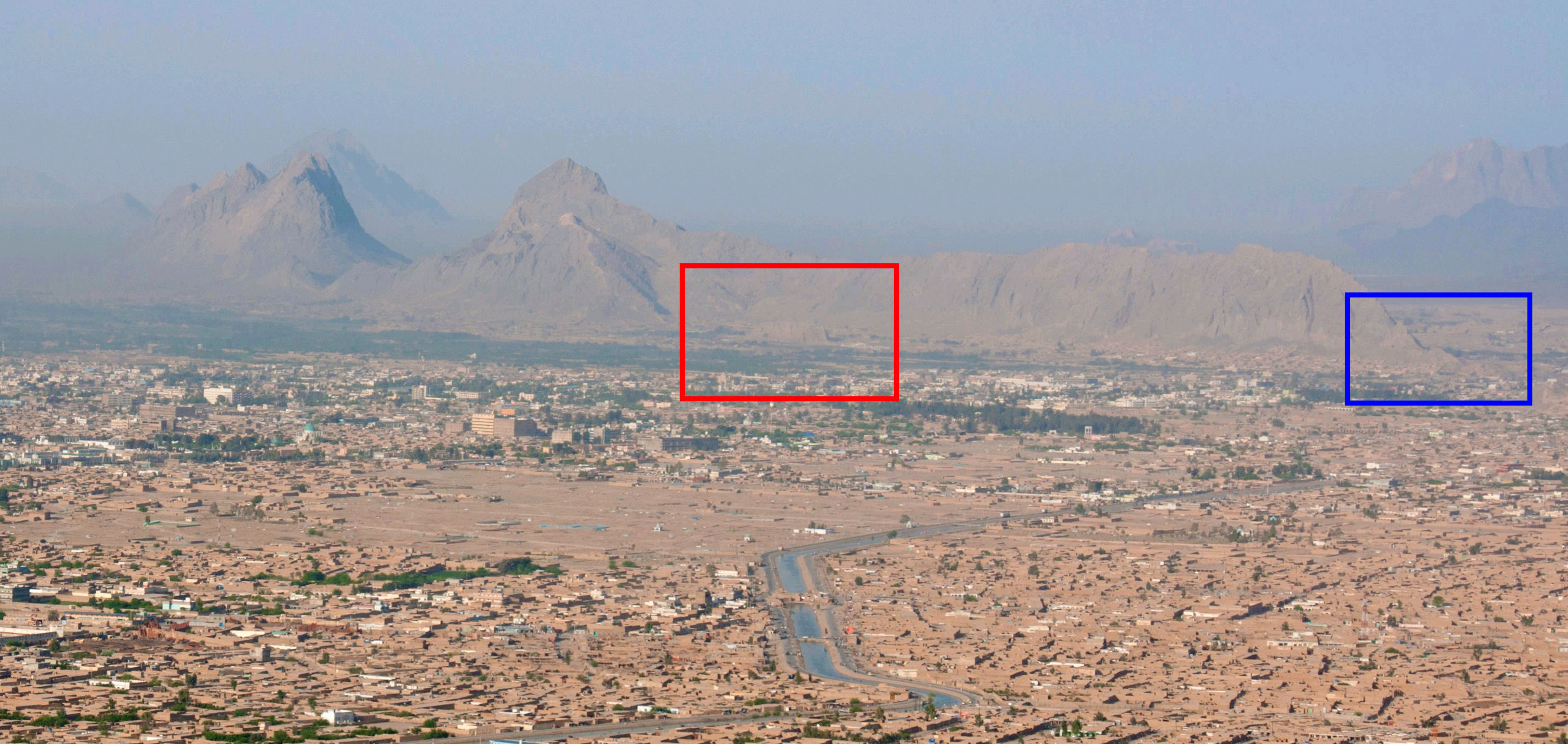
Ancient city of Old Kandahar (red) and Chil Zena mountainous outcrop (blue) on the western side of Kandahar.

The Kandahar Bilingual Rock Inscription, discovered in 1958, is the other well-known Greek inscription by Ashoka in the area of Kandahar. It was found on the mountainside of the Chil Zena outcrop on the western side of the city of Kandahar.

Two other inscriptions in Greek are known at Kandahar. One is a dedication by a Greek man who names himself "son of Aristonax" (3rd century BCE). The other is an elegiac composition by Sophytos son of Naratos (2nd century BCE).

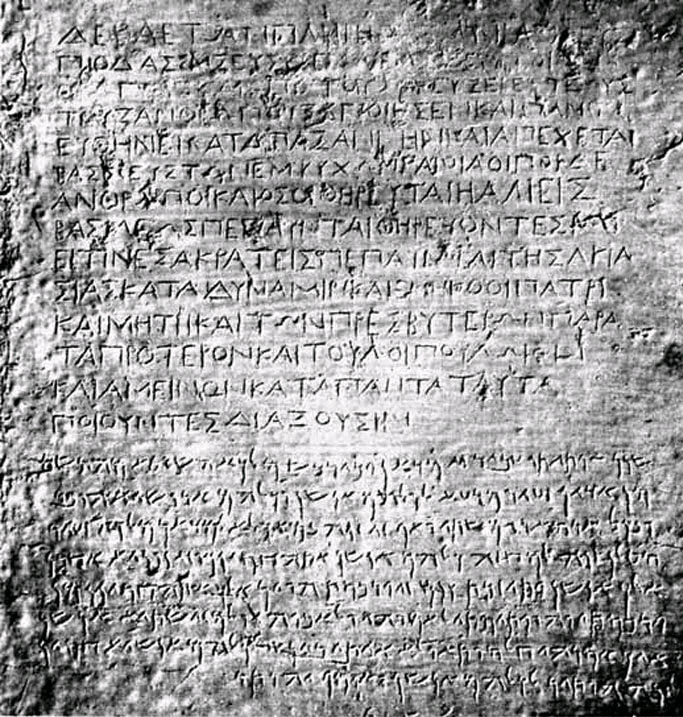
Kandahar Bilingual Rock Inscription in Greek and Aramaic, by Emperor Ashoka, 3rd century BCE, Kandahar.

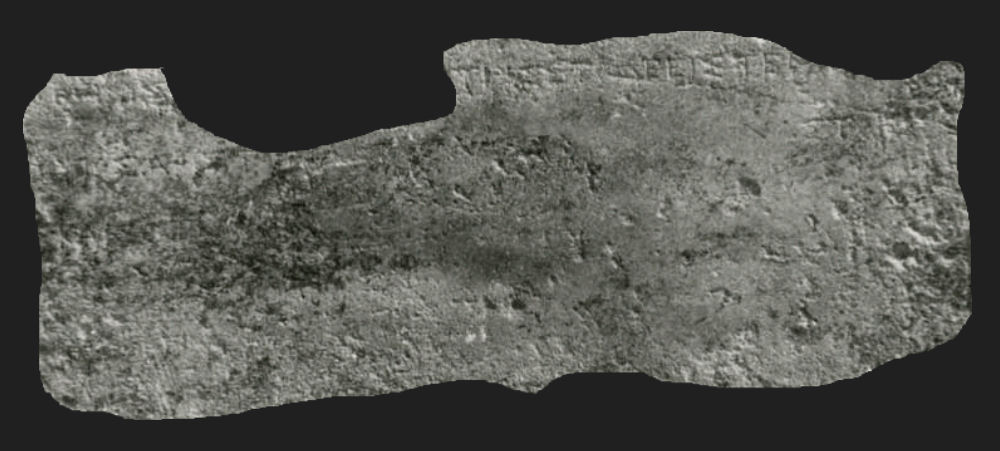
Inscription in Greek by the "son of Aristonax", 3rd century BCE, Kandahar.

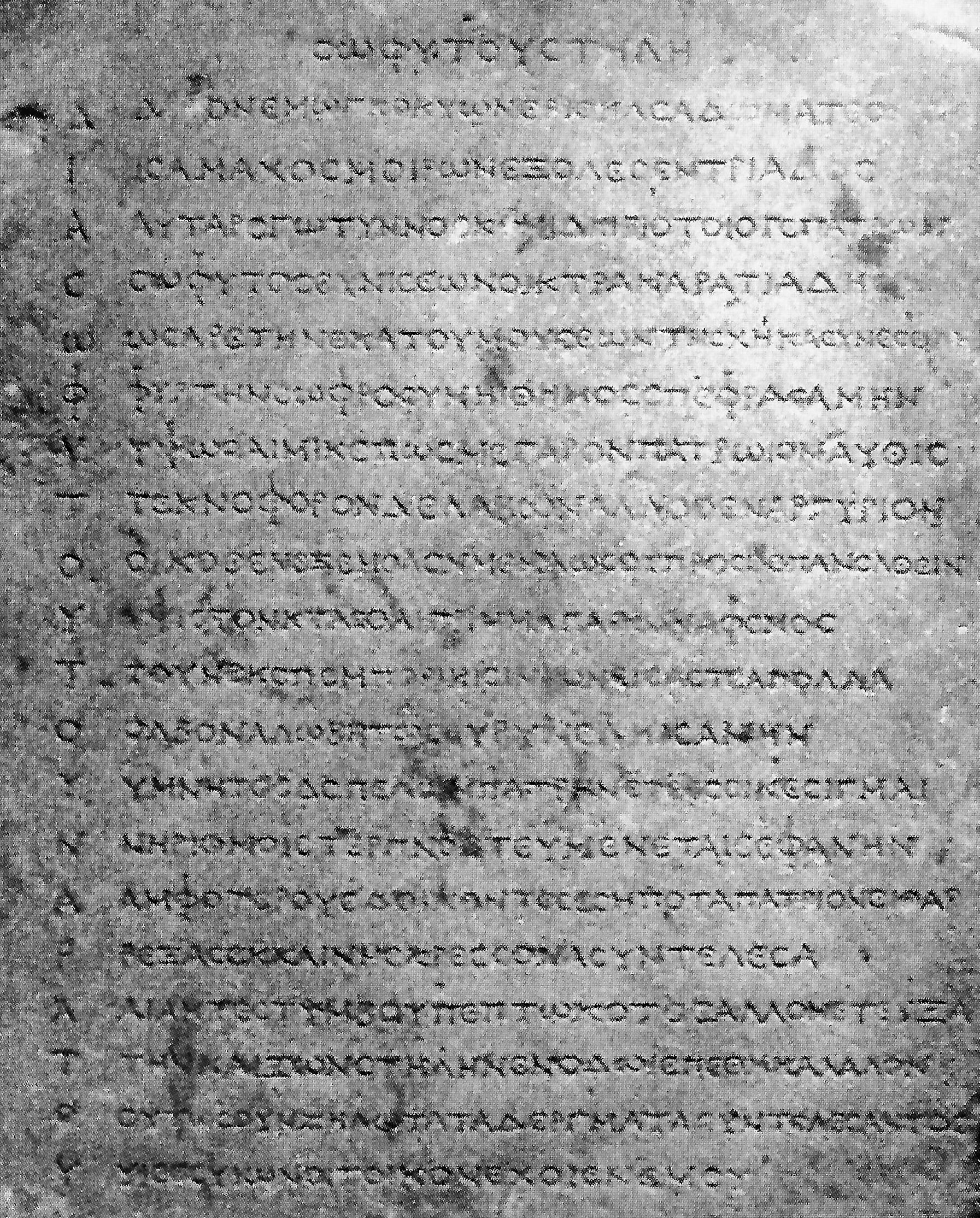
Kandahar Sophytos Inscription, 2nd century BCE, Kandahar.

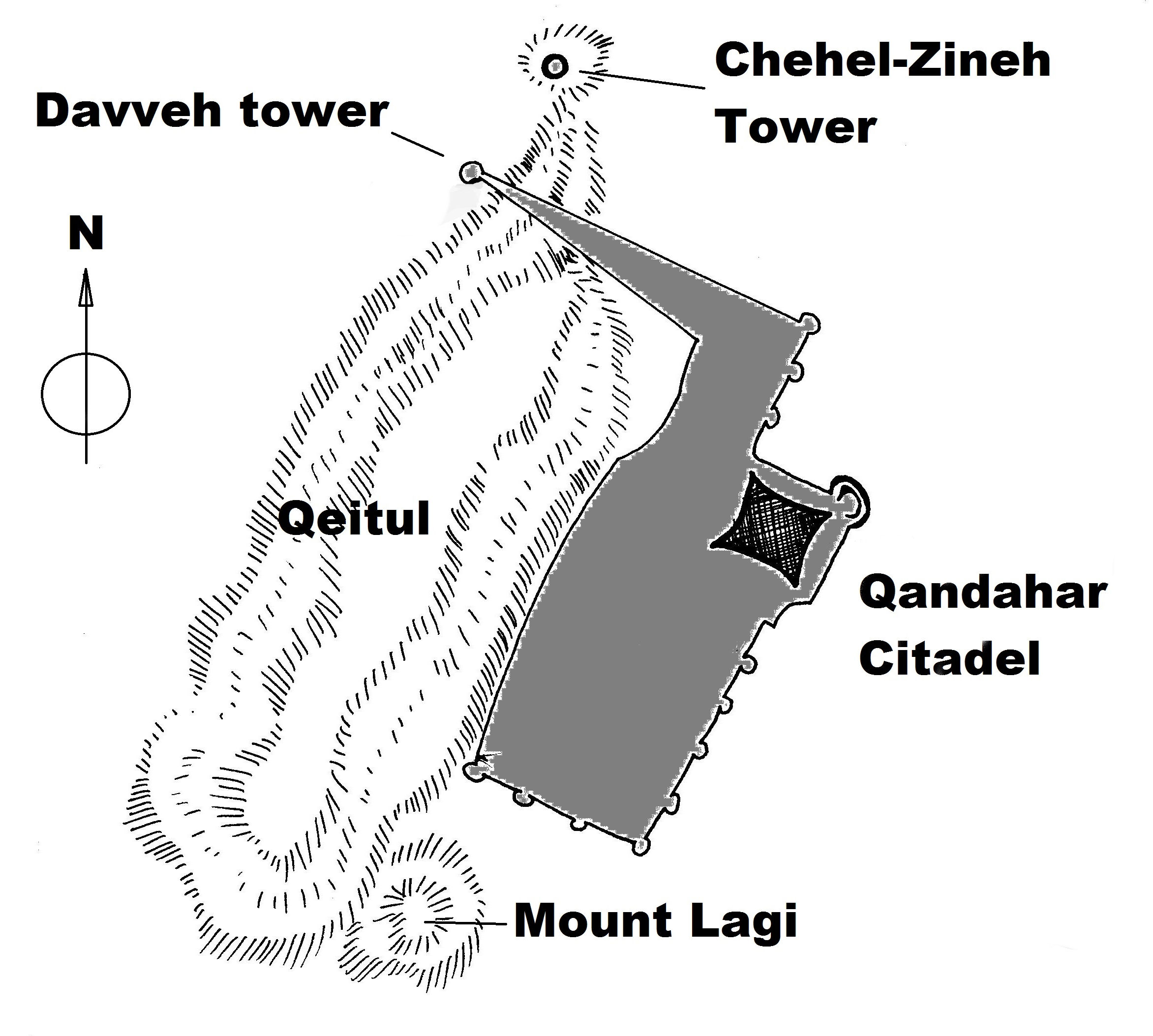
Plan of ancient fortifications of Kandahar.

== See also ==
- Edicts of Ashoka
- Gandharan Buddhism
- Greco-Buddhism
- Indo-Greek Kingdom
- Kandahar Bilingual Rock Inscription
- List of Edicts of Ashoka
- Pillars of Ashoka
