= Kandahar Bilingual Rock Inscription =

Edict of the Mauryan emperor Ashoka in Afghanistan

Coordinates: 31°36′56.3″N 65°39′50.5″E

Kandahar Bilingual Rock Inscription (Kandahar Edict of Ashoka)
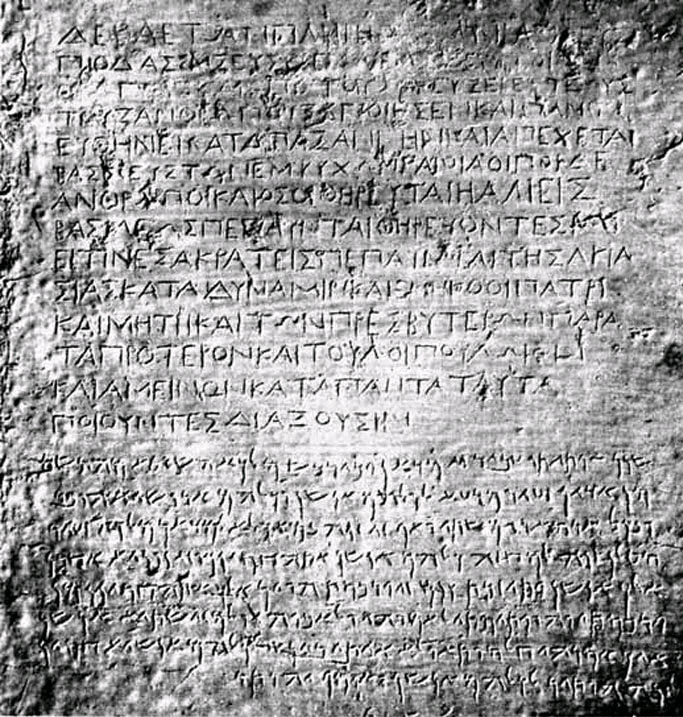
- Bilingual inscription of Ashoka in Greek (top) and Aramaic (bottom) in Afghanistan
- Material: Rock
- Height: 55 cm (22 in)
- Width: 49.5 cm (19.5 in)
- Writing: Greek and Aramaic
- Created: c. 260 BCE
- Period/culture: Mauryan
- Discovered: 1958 (31°36′56.3"N 65°39′50.5"E)
- Place: Chehel Zina, near Kandahar, Afghanistan
- Present location: Kabul Museum (cast)

Location
- Location within Afghanistan Location relative to Western and Central Asia

The Kandahar Bilingual Rock Inscription, also known as the Kandahar Edict of Ashoka and less commonly as the Chehel Zina Edict, is an inscription in the Greek and Aramaic languages that dates back to 260 BCE and was carved by the Mauryan emperor Ashoka (r. 268–232 BCE) at Chehel Zina, a mountainous outcrop near Kandahar, Afghanistan. It is among the earliest-known edicts of Ashoka, having been inscribed around the 8th year of his reign (c. 260 BCE), and precedes all of his other inscriptions, including the Minor Rock Edicts and Barabar Caves in India and the Major Rock Edicts. This early inscription was written exclusively in the Greek and Aramaic languages. It was discovered below a 1-metre (3.3 ft) layer of rubble in 1958 during an excavation project around Kandahar, and is designated as KAI 279.

It is sometimes considered to be a part of Ashoka's Minor Rock Edicts (consequently dubbed "Minor Rock Edict No. 4"), in contrast to his Major Rock Edicts, which contain portions or the totality of his edicts from 1–14. The Kandahar Edict of Ashoka is one of only two ancient inscriptions discovered in Afghanistan that contain Greek writing, with the other being the Kandahar Greek Inscription, which is written exclusively in the Greek language. Chehel Zina, the mountainous outcrop where the edicts were discovered, makes up the western side of the natural bastion of the ancient Greek city of Alexandria Arachosia as well as the Old City of modern-day Kandahar.

The edict remains on the mountainside that it was discovered on. According to the Italian archaeologist Umberto Scerrato, "the block lies at the eastern base of the little saddle between the two craggy hills below the peak on which the celebrated Cehel Zina of Babur are cut". A cast of the inscription is present in the National Museum of Afghanistan in Kabul. In the Kandahar Edict, Ashoka, a patron of Buddhism, advocates the adoption of piety (using the Greek-language term Eusebeia for the Indian concept of Dharma) to the Greek community of Afghanistan.

== Background ==
Greek communities lived in the northwest of the Mauryan empire, currently in Afghanistan, notably ancient Greco-Bactria near the Afghan Region of Badakhshan, and in the region of Arachosia, nowadays in Southern Afghanistan, following the conquest and the colonization efforts of Alexander the Great around 323 BCE. These communities therefore seem to have been still significant in the area of Afghanistan during the reign of Ashoka, about 70 years after Alexander.

== Content ==
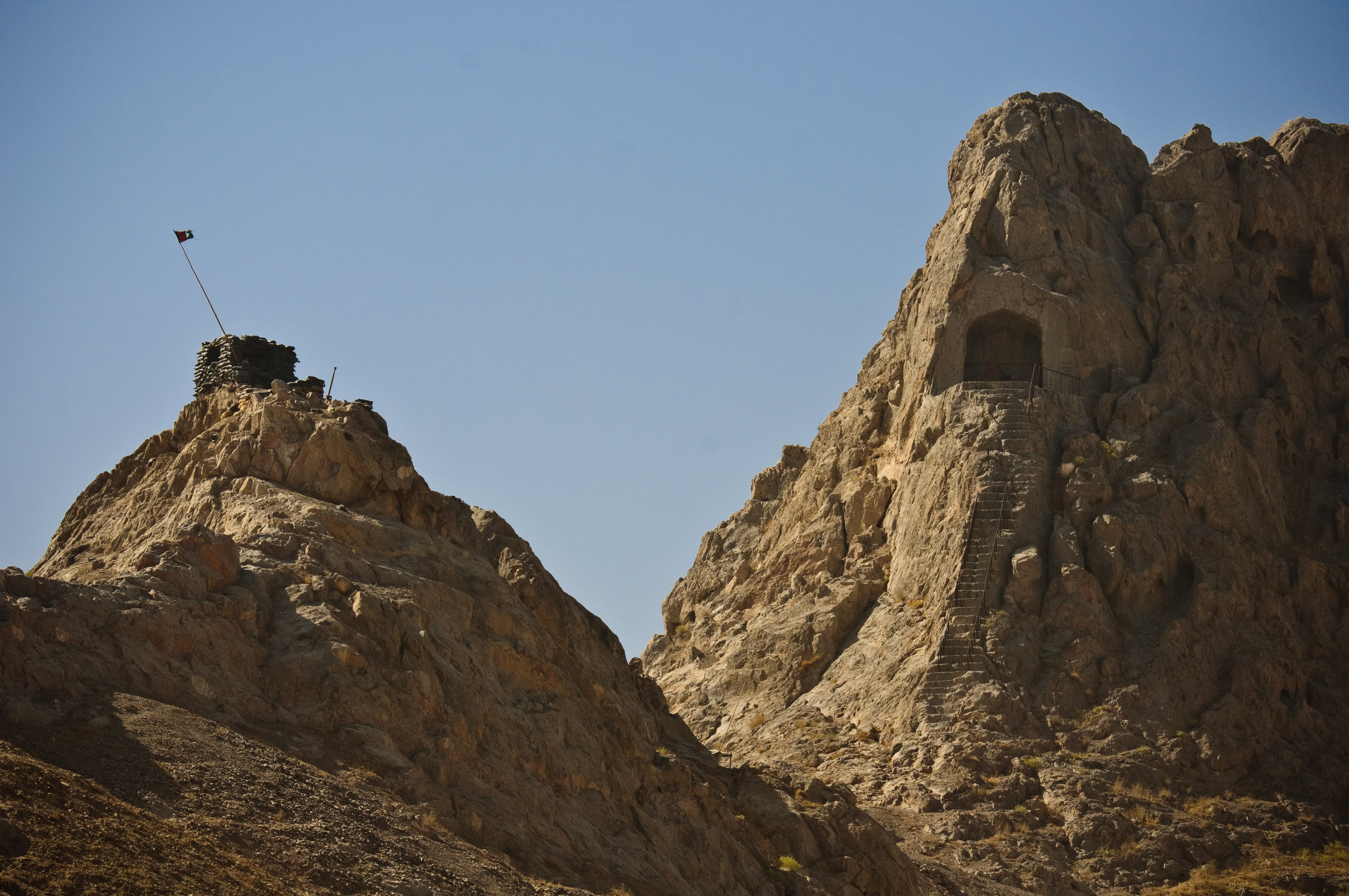
Chil Zena ("40 steps") complex, offering a commanding view of Kandahar, and on the mountainside of which the bilingual edict is carved. Chil Zena commands the entrance to the city of Kandahar when coming from the west.

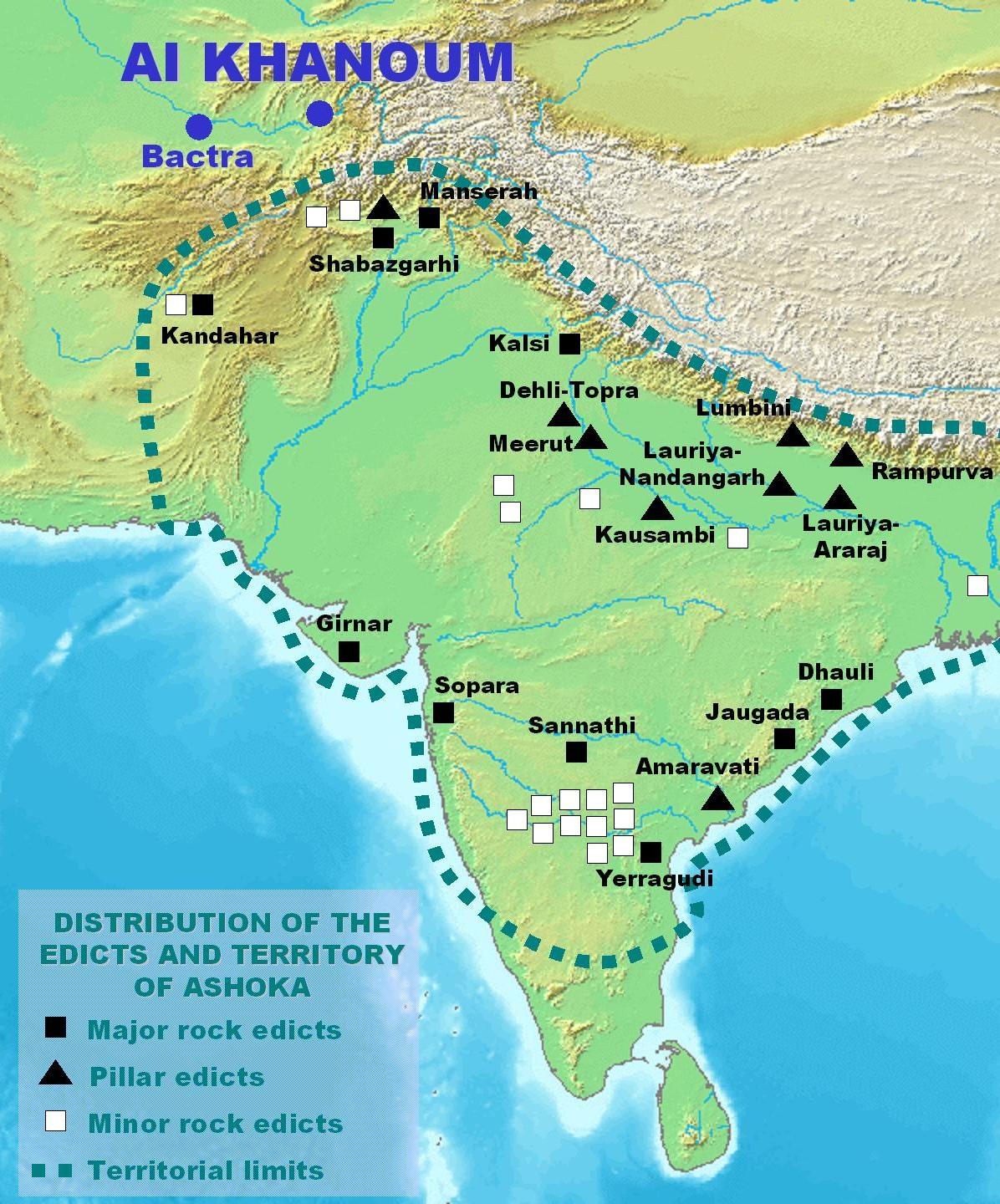
The Kandahar Bilingual Rock Inscription was located at the edge of the Indian realm, near the border with the Greco-Bactrian kingdom and Ai-Khanoum.

Ashoka proclaims his faith, 10 years after the violent beginning of his reign, and affirms that living beings, human or animal, cannot be killed in his realm. In the Hellenistic part of the Edict, he translates the Dharma he advocates by "Piety" εὐσέβεια, Eusebeia, in Greek. The usage of Aramaic reflects the fact that Aramaic (the so-called Official Aramaic) had been the official language of the Achaemenid Empire which had ruled in those parts until the conquests of Alexander the Great. The Aramaic is not purely Aramaic, but seems to incorporate some elements of Iranian. According to D.D.Kosambi, the Aramaic is not an exact translation of the Greek, and it seems rather that both were translated separately from an original text in Magadhi, the common official language of India at the time, used on all the other Edicts of Ashoka in Indian language, even in such linguistically distinct areas as Kalinga. It is written in Aramaic alphabet.

This inscription is actually rather short and general in content, compared to most Major Rock Edicts of Ashoka, including the other inscription in Greek of Ashoka in Kandahar, the Kandahar Greek Edict of Ashoka, which contains long portions of the 12th and 13th edicts, and probably contained much more since it was cut off at the beginning and at the end.

== Implications ==
The proclamation of this Edict in Kandahar is usually taken as proof that Ashoka had control over that part of Afghanistan, presumably after Seleucos had ceded this territory to Chandragupta Maurya in their 305 BCE peace agreement. The Edict also shows the presence of a sizable Greek population in the area, but it also shows the lingering importance of Aramaic, several decades after the fall of the Achaemenid Empire. During the same epoch, the Greeks were firmly established in the newly created Greco-Bactrian kingdom under the reign of Diodotus I, and particularly in the border city of Ai-Khanoum, not far away in the northern part of Afghanistan.

According to Sircar, the usage of Greek in the Edict indeed means that the message was intended for the Greeks living in Kandahar, while the usage of Aramaic was intended for the Iranian populations of the Kambojas.

== Transcription ==
The Greek and Aramaic versions vary somewhat, and seem to be rather free interpretations of an original text in Prakrit. The Aramaic text clearly recognizes the authority of Ashoka with expressions such as "our Lord, king Priyadasin", "our lord, the king", suggesting that the readers were indeed the subjects of Ashoka, whereas the Greek version remains more neutral with the simple expression "King Ashoka".

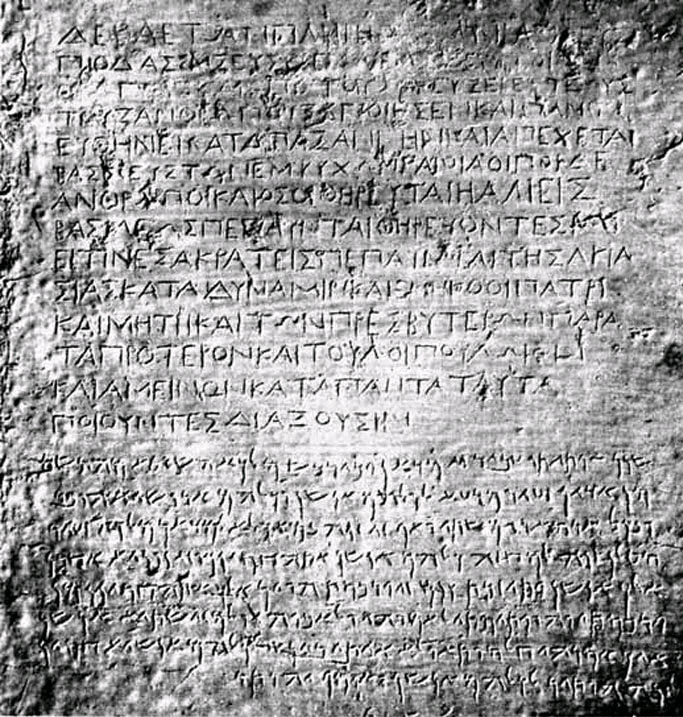

=== Greek (transliteration) ===
ΔΕΚΑ ΕΤΩΝ ΠΛΗΡΗ[ ... ]ΩΝ ΒΑΣΙΛΕΥΣ
ΠΙΟΔΑΣΣΗΣ ΕΥΣΕΒΕΙΑΝ ΕΔΕΙΞΕΝ ΤΟΙΣ ΑΝ-
ΘΡΩΠΟΙΣ ΚΑΙ ΑΠΟ ΤΟΥΤΟΥ ΕΥΣΕΒΕΣΤΕΡΟΥΣ
ΤΟΥΣ ΑΝΘΡΩΠΟΥΣ ΕΠΟΙΗΣΕΝ ΚΑΙ ΠΑΝΤΑ
ΕΥΘΗΝΕΙ ΚΑΤΑ ΠΑΣΑΝ ΓΗΝ ΚΑΙ ΑΠΕΧΕΤΑΙ
ΒΑΣΙΛΕΥΣ ΤΩΝ ΕΜΨΥΧΩΝ ΚΑΙ ΟΙ ΛΟΙΠΟΙ ΔΕ
ΑΝΘΡΩΠΟΙ ΚΑΙ ΟΣΟΙ ΘΗΡΕΥΤΑΙ Η ΑΛΙΕΙΣ
ΒΑΣΙΛΕΩΣ ΠΕΠΑΥΝΤΑΙ ΘΗΡΕΥΟΝΤΕΣ ΚΑΙ
ΕΙ ΤΙΝΕΣ ΑΚΡΑΤΕΙΣ ΠΕΠΑΥΝΤΑΙ ΤΗΣ ΑΚΡΑ-
ΣΙΑΣ ΚΑΤΑ ΔΥΝΑΜΙΝ ΚΑΙ ΕΝΗΚΟΟΙ ΠΑΤΡΙ
ΚΑΙ ΜΗΤΡΙ ΚΑΙ ΤΩΝ ΠΡΕΣΒΥΤΕΡΩΝ ΠΑΡΑ
ΤΑ ΠΡΟΤΕΡΟΝ ΚΑΙ ΤΟΥ ΛΟΙΠΟΥ ΛΩΙΟΝ
ΚΑΙ ΑΜΕΙΝΟΝ ΚΑΤΑ ΠΑΝΤΑ ΤΑΥΤΑ
ΠΟΙΟΥΝΤΕΣ ΔΙΑΞΟΥΣΙΝ

=== English (translation of the Greek) ===
1. Ten years (of reign) having been completed, King
2. Piodasses made known (the doctrine of)
3. Piety (εὐσέβεια, Eusebeia) to men; and from this moment he has made
4. men more pious, and everything thrives throughout
5. the whole world. And the king abstains from (killing)
6. living beings, and other men and those who (are)
7. huntsmen and fishermen of the king have desisted
8. from hunting. And if some (were) intemperate, they
9. have ceased from their intemperance as was in their
10. power; and obedient to their father and mother and to
11. the elders, in opposition to the past also in the future,
12. by so acting on every occasion, they will live better
13. and more happily."

=== Aramaic alphabet ===
Romanization

šnn y ptytw ‘byd zy mr’n pryd’rš mlk’ qšyṭ’ mhqšṭ
mn ’dyn z‘yr mr‘’ lklhm ’nšn wklhm ’dwšy’ hwbd
wbkl ’rq’ r’m šty w’p zy znh km’kl’ lmr’n mlk’ z‘yr
qṭln znh lmḥzh klhm ’nšn ’thhsynn ’zy nwny’ ’ḥdn
’lk ’nšn ptyzbt knm zy prbst hwyn ’lk ’thḥsynn mn
prbsty whwptysty l’mwhy wl’bwhy wlmzyšty’ ’nsn
’yk ’srhy ḥlqwt’ wl’ ’yty dyn’ lklhm ’nšy’ ḥsyn
znh hwtyr lklhm ’nšn w’wsp yhwtr.

Aramaic

𐡔𐡍𐡍 𐡉 𐡐𐡕𐡉𐡕𐡅 𐡏𐡁𐡉𐡃 𐡆𐡉 𐡌𐡓𐡀𐡍 𐡐𐡓𐡉𐡃𐡀𐡓𐡔 𐡌𐡋𐡊𐡀 𐡒𐡔𐡉𐡈𐡀 𐡌𐡄𐡒𐡔𐡈
𐡌𐡍 𐡀𐡃𐡉𐡍 𐡆𐡏𐡉𐡓 𐡌𐡓𐡏𐡀 𐡋𐡊𐡋𐡄𐡌 𐡀𐡍𐡔𐡍 𐡅𐡊𐡋𐡄𐡌 𐡀𐡃𐡅𐡔𐡉𐡀 𐡄𐡅𐡁𐡃
𐡅𐡁𐡊𐡋 𐡀𐡓𐡒𐡀 𐡓𐡀𐡌 𐡔𐡕𐡉 𐡅𐡀𐡐 𐡆𐡉 𐡆𐡍𐡄 𐡊𐡌𐡀𐡊𐡋𐡀 𐡋𐡌𐡓𐡀𐡍 𐡌𐡋𐡊𐡀 𐡆𐡏𐡉𐡓
𐡒𐡈𐡋𐡍 𐡆𐡍𐡄 𐡋𐡌𐡇𐡆𐡄 𐡊𐡋𐡄𐡌 𐡀𐡍𐡔𐡍 𐡀𐡕𐡄𐡇𐡎𐡉𐡍𐡍 𐡀𐡆𐡉 𐡍𐡅𐡍𐡉𐡀 𐡀𐡇𐡃𐡍
𐡀𐡋𐡊 𐡀𐡍𐡔𐡍 𐡐𐡕𐡉𐡆𐡁𐡕 𐡊𐡍𐡌 𐡆𐡉 𐡐𐡓𐡁𐡎𐡕 𐡄𐡅𐡉𐡍 𐡀𐡋𐡊 𐡀𐡕𐡄𐡇𐡎𐡉𐡍𐡍 𐡌𐡍
𐡐𐡓𐡁𐡎𐡕𐡉 𐡅𐡄𐡅𐡐𐡕𐡉𐡎𐡕𐡉 𐡋𐡀𐡌𐡅𐡄𐡉 𐡅𐡋𐡀𐡁𐡅𐡄𐡉 𐡅𐡋𐡌𐡆𐡉𐡔𐡕𐡉𐡀 𐡀𐡍𐡎𐡍
𐡀𐡉𐡊 𐡀𐡎𐡓𐡄𐡉 𐡇𐡋𐡒𐡅𐡕𐡀 𐡅𐡋𐡀 𐡀𐡉𐡕𐡉 𐡃𐡉𐡍𐡀 𐡋𐡊𐡋𐡄𐡌 𐡀𐡍𐡔𐡉𐡀 𐡇𐡎𐡉𐡍
𐡆𐡍𐡄 𐡄𐡅𐡕𐡉𐡓 𐡋𐡊𐡋𐡄𐡌 𐡀𐡍𐡔𐡍 𐡅𐡀𐡅𐡎𐡐 𐡉𐡄𐡅𐡕𐡓

=== English (translation of the Aramaic) ===
1. Ten years having passed (?). It so happened (?) that our lord, king Pridarsh, became the institutor of Truth,
2. Since then, evil diminished among all men and all misfortunes (?) lie caused to disappear; and [there is] peace as well as joy in the whole earth.
3. And, moreover, [there is] this in regard to food: for our lord, the king, [only] a few
4. [animals] are killed; having seen this, all men have given up [the slaughter of animals]; even (?) those men who catch fish (i.e. the fishermen) are subject to prohibition.
5. Similarly, those who were without restraint have ceased to be without restraint.
6. And obedience to mother and to father and to old men [reigns] in conformity with the obligations imposed by fate on each [person].
7. And there is no Judgement for all the pious men,
8. This [i.e. the practice of Law] has been profitable to all men and will be more profitable [in future].

== Other inscriptions in Greek in Kandahar ==
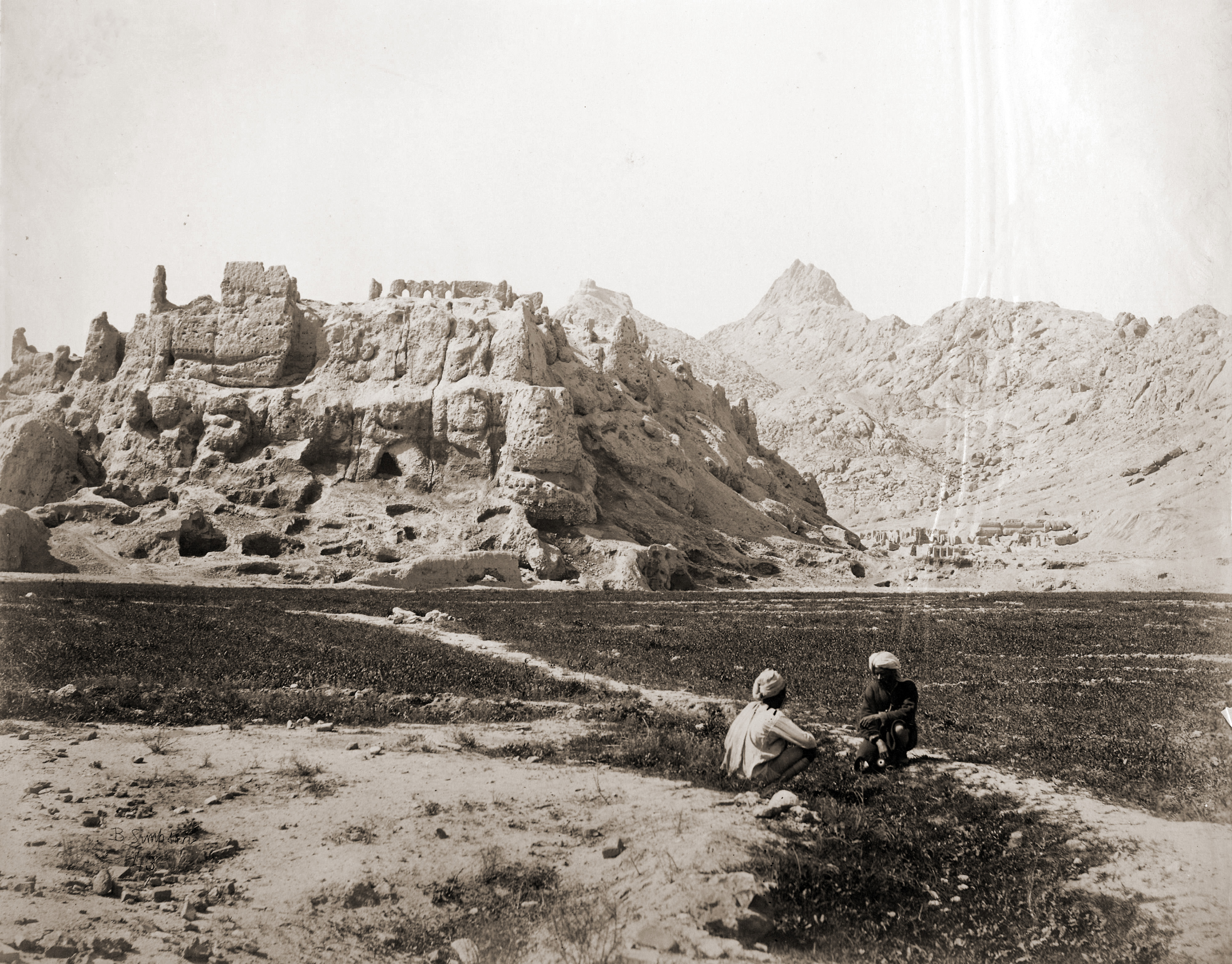
An 1881 photo showing the ruined Old Kandahar citadel ("Zor Shar") where the second Greek edict was discovered.

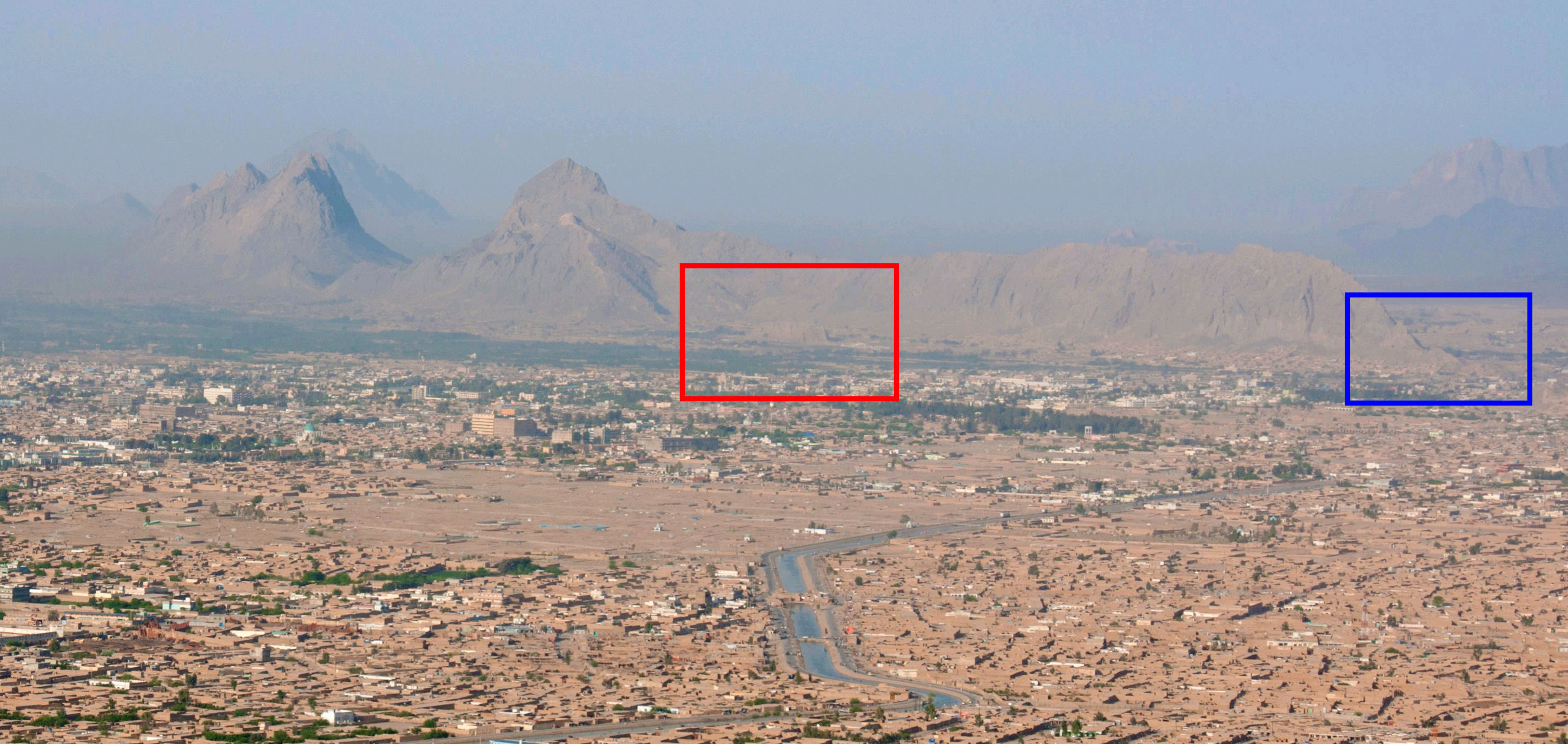
Ancient city of Old Kandahar (red) and Chil Zena mountainous outcrop (blue) on the western side of Kandahar.

The other well-known Greek inscription, the Kandahar Greek Edict of Ashoka, was found 1.5 kilometres (0.93 mi) to the south of the Bilingual Rock Inscription, in the ancient city of Old Kandahar (known as Zor Shar in Pashto, or Shahr-i-Kona in Dari), Kandahar, in 1963. It is thought that Old Kandahar was founded in the 4th century BCE by Alexander the Great, who gave it the Ancient Greek name Αλεξάνδρεια Aραχωσίας (Alexandria of Arachosia). The Edict is a Greek version of the end of the 12th Edicts (which describes moral precepts) and the beginning of the 13th Edict (which describes the King's remorse and conversion after the war in Kalinga). This inscription does not use another language in parallel. It is a plaque of limestone, which probably had belonged to a building, and its size is 45 by 69.53 centimetres (17.72 in × 27.37 in). The beginning and the end of the fragment are lacking, which suggests the inscription was original significantly longer and may have included all fourteen of Ashoka's Edicts, as in several other locations in India. The Greek language used in the inscription is of a very high level and displays philosophical refinement. It also displays an in-depth understanding of the political language of the Hellenic world in the 3rd century BCE. This suggests the presence of a highly cultured Greek presence in Kandahar at that time.

Two other inscriptions in Greek are known at Kandahar. One is a dedication by a Greek man who names himself "son of Aristonax" (3rd century BCE). The other is an elegiac composition by Sophytos son of Naratos (2nd century BCE).

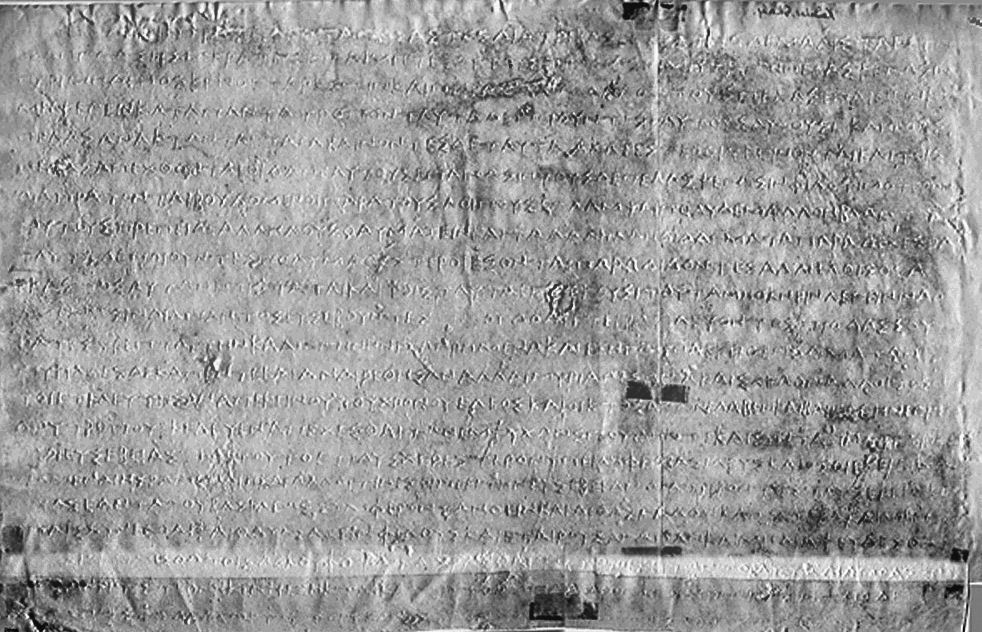
Kandahar Greek Edict of Ashoka, 3rd century BCE, Kandahar.

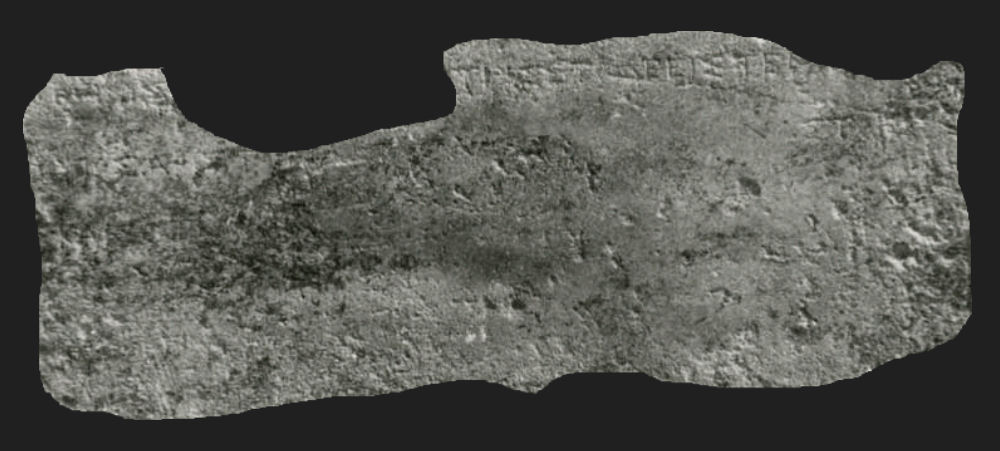
Inscription in Greek by the "son of Aristonax", 3rd century BCE, Kandahar.

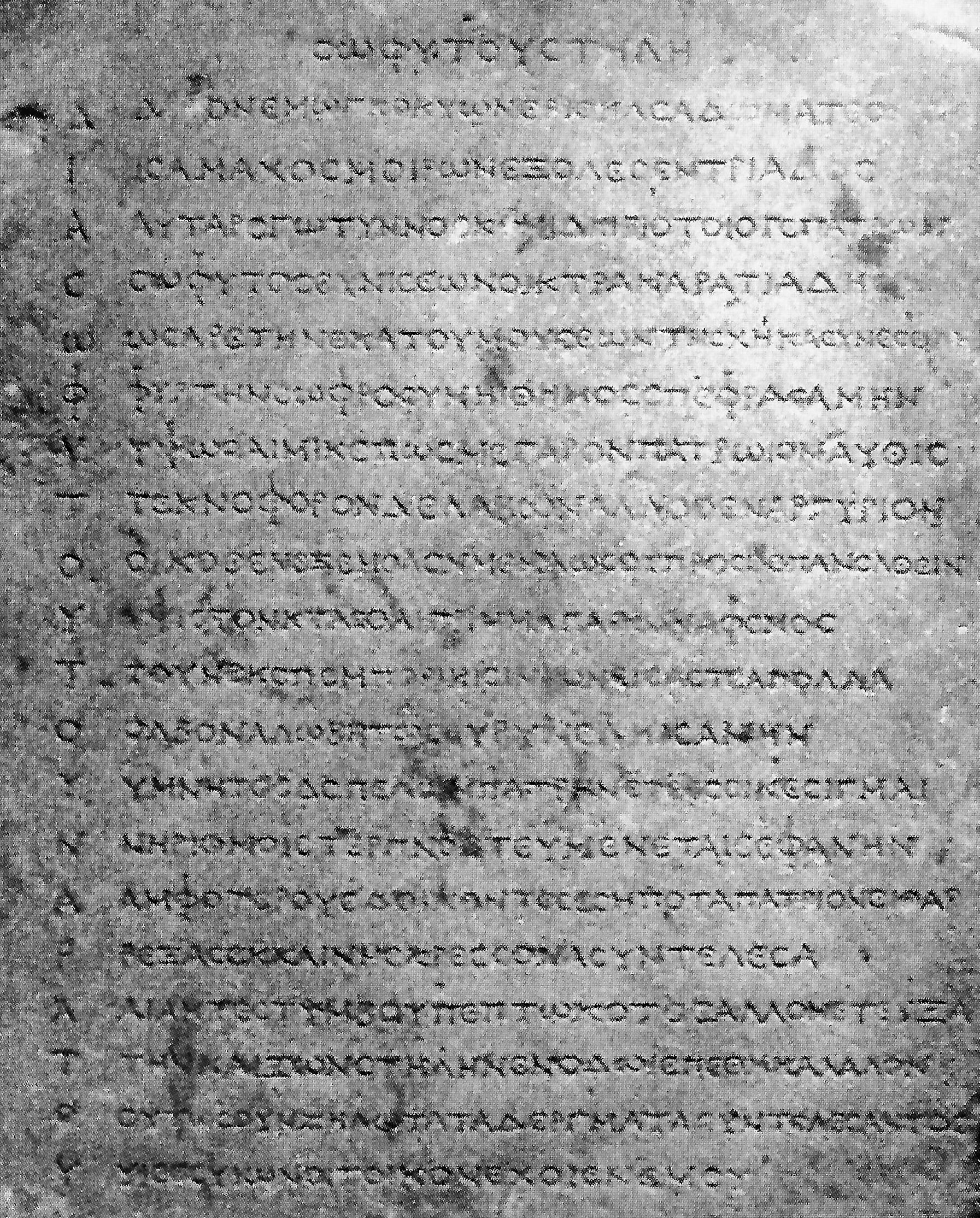
Kandahar Sophytos Inscription, 2nd century BCE, Kandahar.

== See also ==
- List of Edicts of Ashoka
- Edicts of Ashoka
- Greco-Buddhism
- The Greek-Aramaic inscription of Julius Aurelius Zenobius in the Great Colonnade at Palmyra.

== Sources ==
- Filiozat, J. (1961–1962). "Graeco-Aramaic inscription of Ashoka near Kandahar". Epigraphia Indica. 34: 1–10.
