= Chil Zena =

Mountainous outcrop near Kandahar, Afghanistan

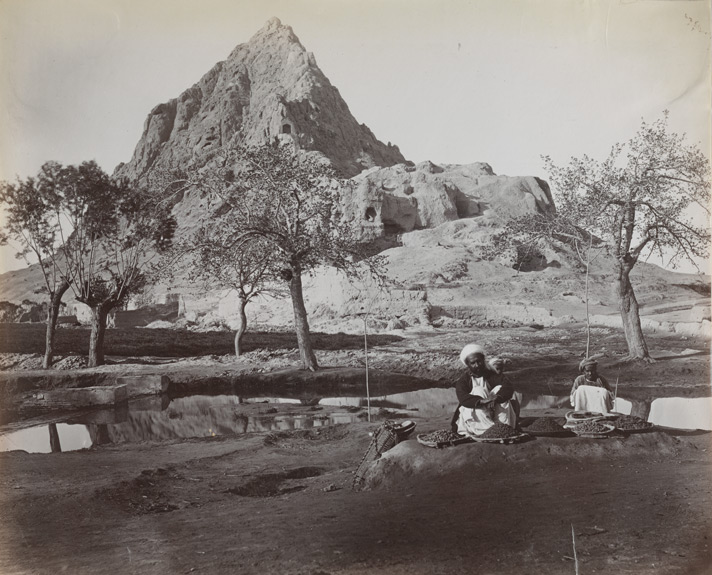
- Chil Zena ("40 steps") complex, offering a commanding view of Kandahar, and on the mountainside of which the bilingual edict is carved. Chil Zena commands the entrance to the city of Kandahar when coming from the west.

- Location within Afghanistan
- 31°36′55″N 65°39′49″E
- Type: Mountainous outcrop

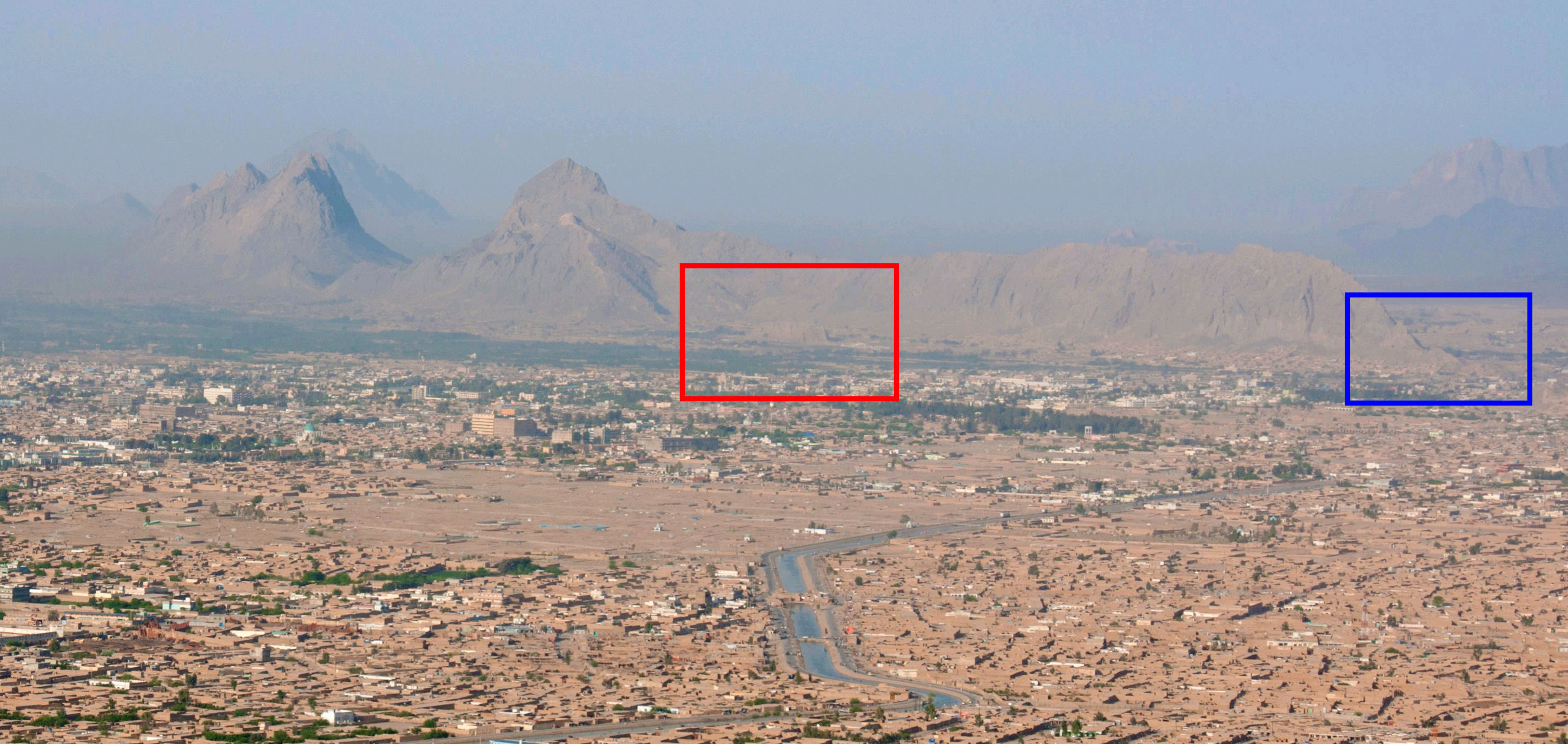
Ancient city of Old Kandahar (red) and Chil Zena mountainous outcrop (blue) on the western side of Kandahar.

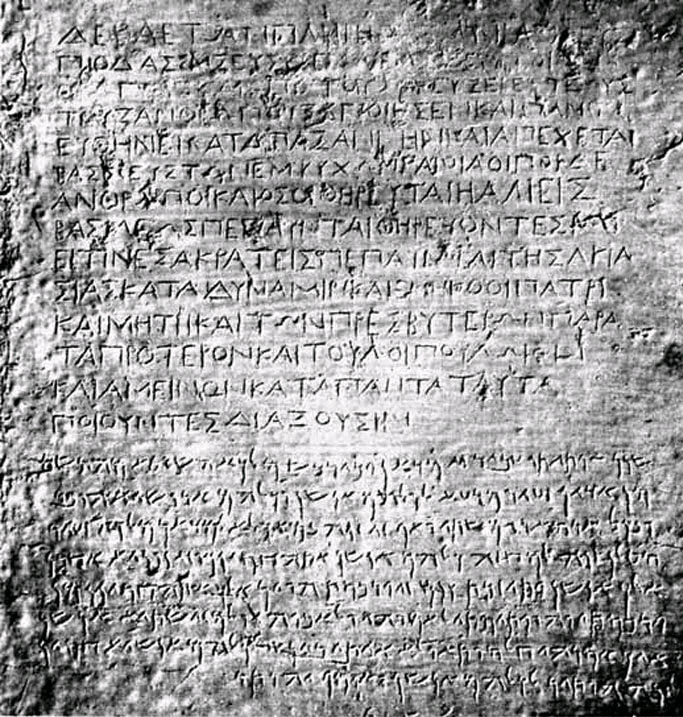
Ashoka's Kandahar Bilingual Rock Inscription is located on the mountainside of Chil Zena.

Chil Zena ("Forty steps"), also Chilzina or Chehel Zina, is a mountainous outcrop at the western limit of the city of Kandahar, Afghanistan. Forty stone steps lead to the top of the outcrop, hence its name. It gives a commanding view on the city of Kandahar. Chil Zena was located on the northern side of the old citadel of Old Kandahar, destroyed by Nadir Shah Afshar of Persia in 1738. The carving of the staircase was commissioned by the Emperor Babur. Chil Zena later received numerous inscriptions about the conquests of Babur (1526-1530), apparently carved by his son Humayun.

Chil Zena is well known for the discovery of the Indian Emperor Ashoka's Kandahar Bilingual Rock Inscription on the mountainside, which is still located on in an open-air compound on the mountainside. The presence of this inscription at Chil Zena helped confirm the presence of Greek populations in the vicinity in the 3rd century BCE, as well as the extent of Ashoka's control, which is therefore thought to have incorporated Kandahar and its region of Arachosia.
