= Naderabad, Kandahar =

Former Afghan city

Naderabad (Persian: نادرآباد) was a city created in 1738 by Nader Shah, the King of Persia from 1736 to 1747. Nader built the city in the aftermath of his army's destruction of Old Kandahar and named the city after himself. The city was near the Šorāb river, and four kilometres (2.5 mi) from the remnants of Old Kandahar. When Nader Shah died in 1747 the city was abandoned, though it continued to appear on 19th century European maps.

== See also ==
- Kandahar
- Old Kandahar
