= Kandahar Sophytos Inscription =

Inscription in Kandahar, Afghanistan

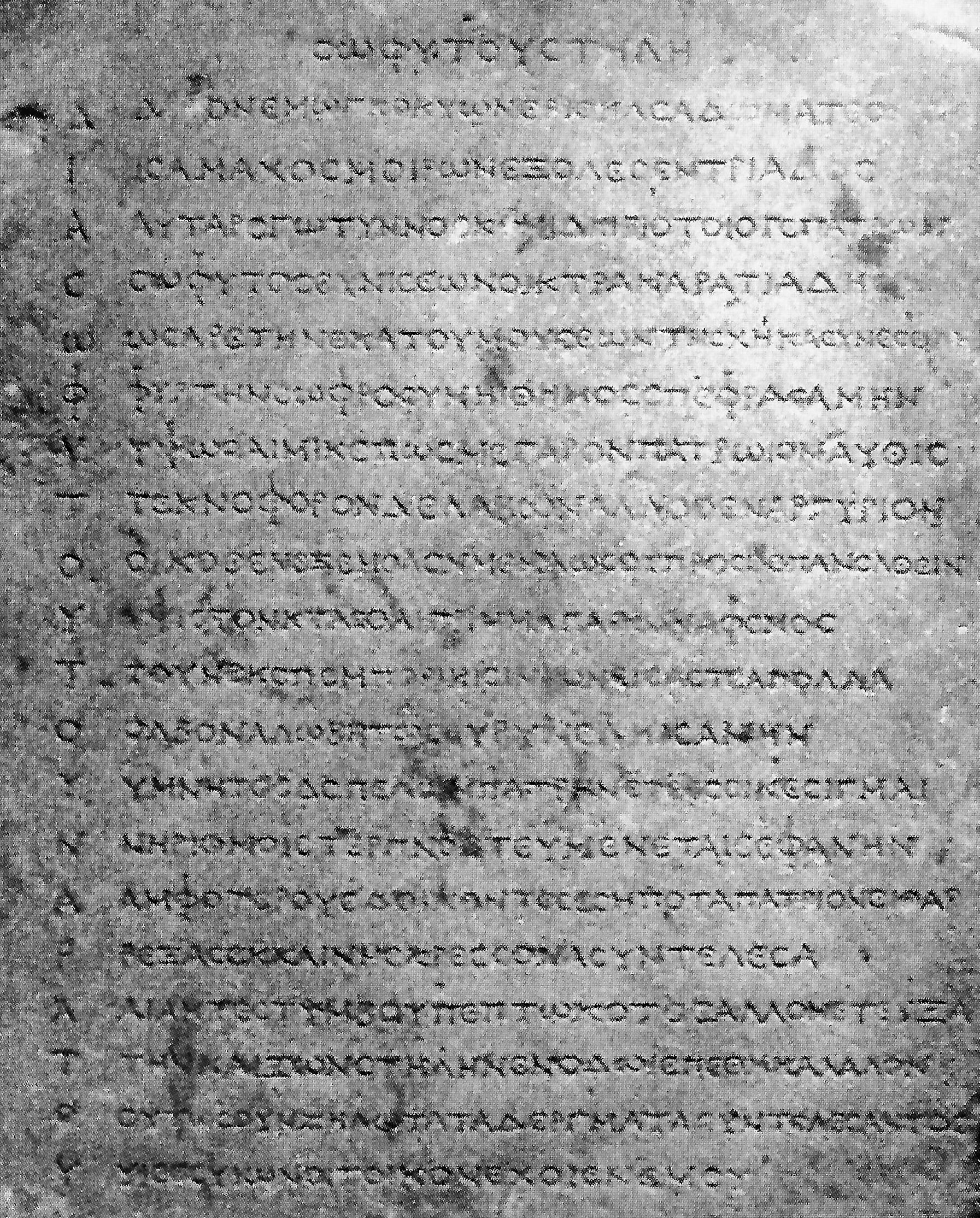
Inscription in Greek by Sophytos, 2nd century BCE, Kandahar.

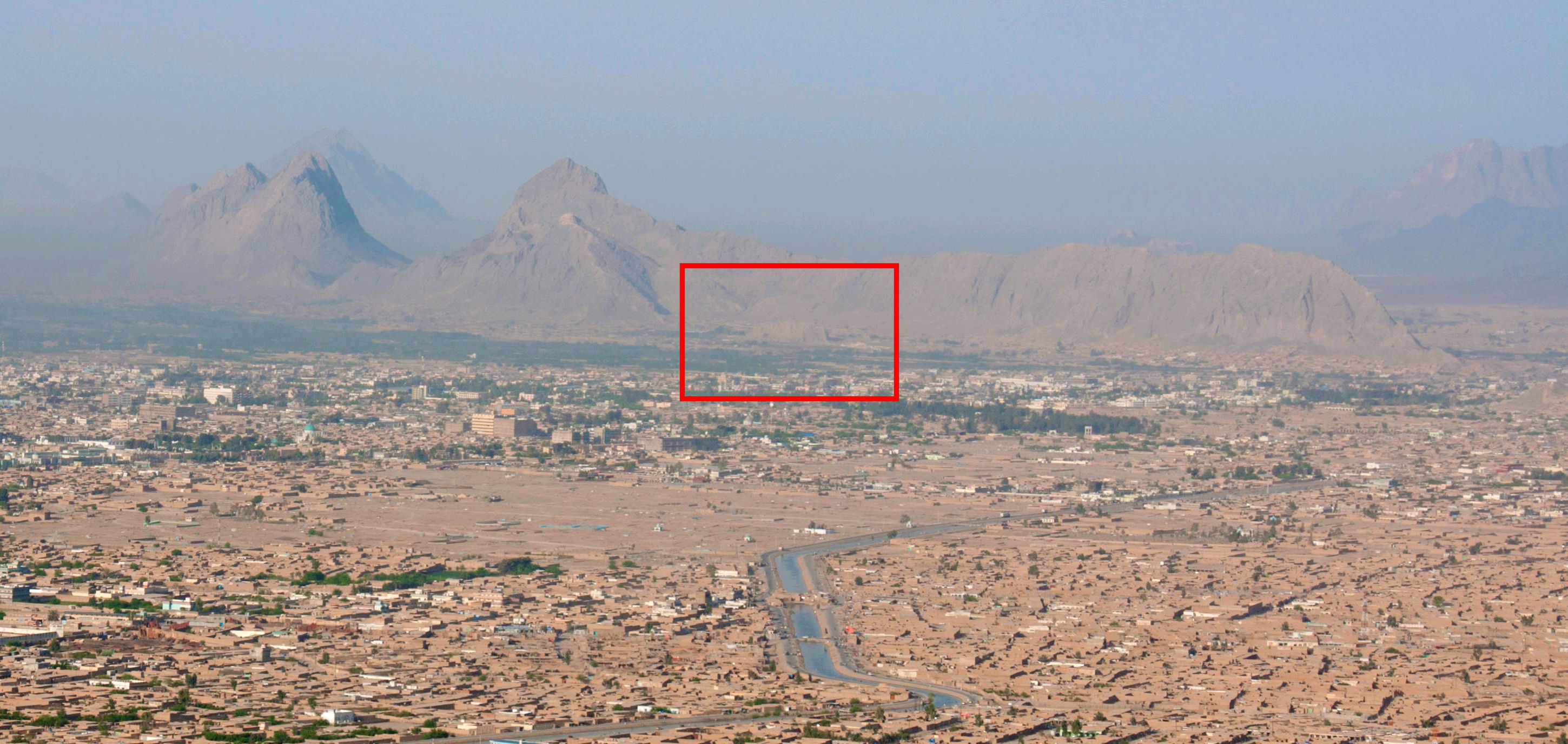
Ancient city of Old Kandahar (red) where the inscription was found.

The Kandahar Sophytos Inscription is an inscription in Greek made by Sophytos (Greek: Σώφυτος), son of Naratos, in the 2nd century BCE, in the city of Kandahar, Afghanistan. The inscription is written on a square limestone plaque, which was probably part of a wall. The inscription, although bought on a market, is thought to have come from Old Kandahar, the supposed ancient Alexandria in Arachosia.

The text is written in a very high level Greek language, displaying a real refinement of Greek culture so far east in Kandahar. The verses are in the sophisticated acrostich form.

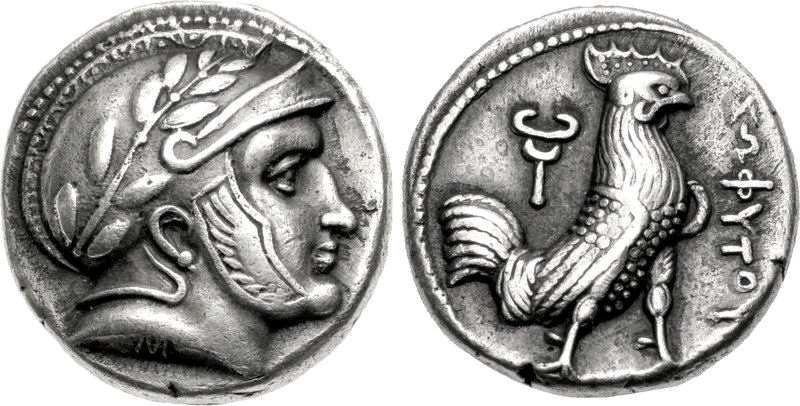
Coin of Satrap Sophytes (or Sophytos).

Sophytos and Naratos are not Greek names. They may have been Indian, their actual names being possibly Subhūti and Nārada. The name "Sophytos" is also known from a series of 4th-3rd century Greek coins belonging to the eponymous Satrap Sophytos, who is otherwise unknown, and whom the Sophytos of the inscription may or may not have been a descendant.

According to the inscription, Sophytos was ruined in early life, but later rebuilt his fortune through fortitude. Some authors consider that his ruin may be due to the invasion of Arachosia by the Greco-Bactrians in the 2nd century BCE, supposing that the family Sophytos had been Hellenized Indian in the service of the Maurya Empire.

One hypothesis regarding the inscription's historical context put forward is: Sophytos's family might have been of Indian origin. His family was in the service of the Maurya Empire in the region of Arachosia. The ruin that the house of Sophytos's ancestors had suffered could be associated with the demise of Mauryan power in Arachosia when the Greco-Bactrian king Demetrios re-conquered the area from the Mauryan dynasty in 190 BC. Resulting in the persecution of prominent families connected to the Mauryan regime by the new rulers. Sophytos, who as a child had acquired a Greek education living among Greeks, composed his own epitaph years later in learned and elaborate Greek perhaps to fit in and impress the ruling Greek-speaking elite, or the other Greek speaking inhabitants. It is not known, how the Greek or Greek-educated community of Kandahar felt about Sophytos

There is only one mistake in prosody that has been identified in the whole text. It is not known if Sophytes wrote the poem himself, or hired a competent local professional. The metrical flaws might be due to later modification of the original. Possibly an intermediary between the poet and the stone cutter, perhaps Sophytes himself was the one who modified it. He would have to be sufficiently appreciative of literary arts to commission a poem and to feel capable to modify it, while in fact not to be competent enough to register that the modification has introduced metrical flaws. His education is probably not much more than an ability to read and write Greek.

The usage of Greek and Aramaic is attested in the area from the 3rd century BCE due to the Kandahar Bilingual Rock Inscription of Emperor Ashoka.

== Greek transliteration ==
ϹΩΦΥΤΟΥ ϹΤΗΛΗ

Δ ΔΗΡΟΝ ΕΜΩΓ ΚΟΚΥΩΝ ΕΡΙΘΗΛΕΑ ΔΩΜΑΤ ΕΟΝΤΑ
Ι ΙϹ ΑΜΑΧΟϹ ΜΟΙΡΩΝ ΕΞΟΛΕϹΕΝ ΤΡΙΑΔΟϹ
Α ΑΥΤΑΡ ΕΓΩ ΤΥΝΝΟϹ ΚΟΜΙΔΗΙ ΒΙΟΤΟΙΟ ΤΕ ΠΑΤΡΩΝ
Ϲ ϹΩΦΥΤΟϹ ΕΥΝΙϹ ΕΩΝ ΟΙΚΤΡΑ ΝΑΡΑΤΙΑΔΗϹ
Ω ΩϹ ΑΡΕΤΗΝ ΕΚΑΤΟΥ ΜΟΥϹΕΩΝ Τ ΗϹΧΗΚΑ ϹΥΝ ΕϹΘΛΗΙ
Φ ΦΥΡΤΗΝ ϹΩΦΡΟϹΥΝΗΙ ΘΗΜΟϹ ΕΠΕΦΡΑϹΑΜΗΝ
Υ ΥΨΩϹΑΙΜΙ ΚΕ ΠΩϹ ΜΕΓΑΡΟΝ ΠΑΤΡΩΙΟΝ ΑΥΘΙϹ
Τ ΤΕΚΝΟΦΟΡΟΝ ΔΕ ΛΑΒΩΝ ΑΛΛΟΘΕΝ ΑΡΓΥΡΙΟΝ
Ο ΟΙΚΟΘΕΝ ΕΞΕΜΟΛΟΝ ΜΕΜΑΩϹ ΟΥ ΠΡΟϹΘ ΕΠΑΝΕΛΘΕΙΝ
Υ ΥΨΙϹΤΟΝ ΚΤΑϹΘΑΙ ΠΡΙΜ Μ ΑΓΑΘΩΝ ΑΦΕΝΟϹ
Τ ΤΟΥΝΕΚ ΕΠ ΕΜΠΟΡΙΗΙϹΙΝ ΙΩΝ ΕΙϹ ΑϹΤΕΑ ΠΟΛΛΑ
Ο ΟΛΒΟΝ ΑΛΩΒΗΤΟϹ ΕΥΡΥΝ ΕΛΗϹΑΜΗΝ
Υ ΥΜΝΗΤΟϹ ΔΕ ΠΕΛΩΝ ΠΑΤΡΗΝ ΕΤΕΕϹϹΙΝ ΕϹΙΓΜΑΙ
Ν ΝΗΡΙΘΜΟΙϹ ΤΕΡΠΝΟϹ Τ ΕΥΜΕΝΕΤΑΙϹ ΕΦΑΝΗΝ
Α ΑΜΦΟΤΕΡΟΥϹ Δ ΟΙΚΟΝ ΤΕ ϹΕϹΗΠΟΤΑ ΠΑΤΡΙΟΝ ΕΙΘΑΡ
Ρ ΡΕΞΑϹ ΕΚ ΚΑΙΝΗϹ ΚΡΕϹϹΟΝΑ ϹΥΝΤΕΛΕϹΑ
Α ΑΙΑΝ Τ ΕϹ ΤΥΜΒΟΥ ΠΕΠΤΩΚΟΤΟϹ ΑΛΛΟΝ ΕΤΕΥΞΑ
Τ ΤΗΝ ΚΑΙ ΖΩΝ ϹΤΗΛΗΝ ΕΝ ΟΔΩΙ ΕΠΕΘΗΚΑ ΛΑΛΟΝ
Ο ΟΥΤΩϹ ΟΥΝ ΖΗΛΩΤΑ ΤΑΔ ΕΡΓΜΑΤΑ ϹΥΝΤΕΛΕϹΑΝΤΟϹ
Υ ΥΙΕΕϹ ΥΙΩΝΟΙ Τ ΟΙΚΟΝ ΕΧΟΙΕΝ ΕΜΟΥ.

Nota: As often on Hellenistic inscriptions, the sigma Σ has been replaced by the lunate sigma C.

== English translation ==
Stele of Sophytos

1. For a long time the house of my ancestors had been thriving
2. when the unbeatable violence of the triple Fates destroyed it.
3. But I, Sophytos of the stock of Naratos, all together so small
4. and pitiably bereft of the support of my parents,
5. practiced the excellence of the Muses and The Shooter
6. mixed with noble prudence
7. and devised a way to build up my ancestral home again:
8. with fruit-bearing money taken from elsewhere,
9. I went away from home determined not to come back
10. until I acquired the greatest abundance of good things.
11. For this reason I went on merchant ships into many a city
12. and acquired sound and far-reaching wealth.
13. Surrounded by praise, I came back to my homeland after innumerable years,
14. and a delight I proved to be to my well-wishers.
15. And both the paternal house that was rotten
16. I made at once stronger out of new means
17. and, with the tomb having fallen to the ground, I built another one;
18. and while still alive I set up by the road this telling stele.
19. Would that my sons and grandchildren keep this house of mine so,
20. for I have accomplished these enviable deeds!

The left vertical line, formed by repeating the first letter of each sentence (acrostich) reads ΔΙΑ ΣΩΦΥΤΟΥ ΤΟΥ ΝΑΡΑΤΟΥ "By Sophytos, son of Naratos"
