= Diavata refugee camp =

Syrian, Iraqi, and Afghan refugee camp in Greece

Coordinates: 40.7022°N 22.8639°E

Diavata refugee camp is a military-run refugee camp located in Diavata, a community belonging to the municipality of Delta, Central Macedonia, Greece. The camp opened on 24 February 2016 to host Syrian, Afghan and Iraqi refugees fleeing the Syrian civil war, the long-ongoing Afghan conflict and the Iraq War. The camp has capacity for 2500 refugees and as of 1 July 2016, hosts 1,744 refugees in 171 tents and 134 RHUs (Refugee Housing Units).

The former military camp of Anagnostopoulou was reconverted in the current Diavata refugee camp, producing protests by about 800 neighbours of Diavata, that opposed the creation of a refugee camp in their village.

On 21 April 2016 a fire presumably started from a cooking fire. The strong wind and the proximity between shelters resulted in the burning down of 25 tents, with some refugees losing part of their belongings, including clothes, passports or money. Some people were treated due to smoke inhalation, but no injuries were reported.

A refugee living in the camp stated to receive only a juice in the morning, noodles with a bread for lunch and nothing for dinner. He also reported that some tents host two or even three families, and that single men are accommodated in the building on the territory.

== Camp statistics ==
Date	Number of refugees	Syrian (%)	Afghan (%)	Iraqi (%)	Other (%)	Adults (%)	Children (%)	Tents	RHUs
14-04-2016	2,281	75	11	14	?	60	40	145	160
12-05-2016	2,320	75	11	12	?	55	45	171	134
14-06-2016	1,804	75	12	?	13	52	48	171	134

The data is extracted from UNHCR statistics
