= Old Kandahar =

Ancient area of Kandahar in Afghanistan

Coordinates: 31°36′08″N 65°39′32″E

Old Kandahar

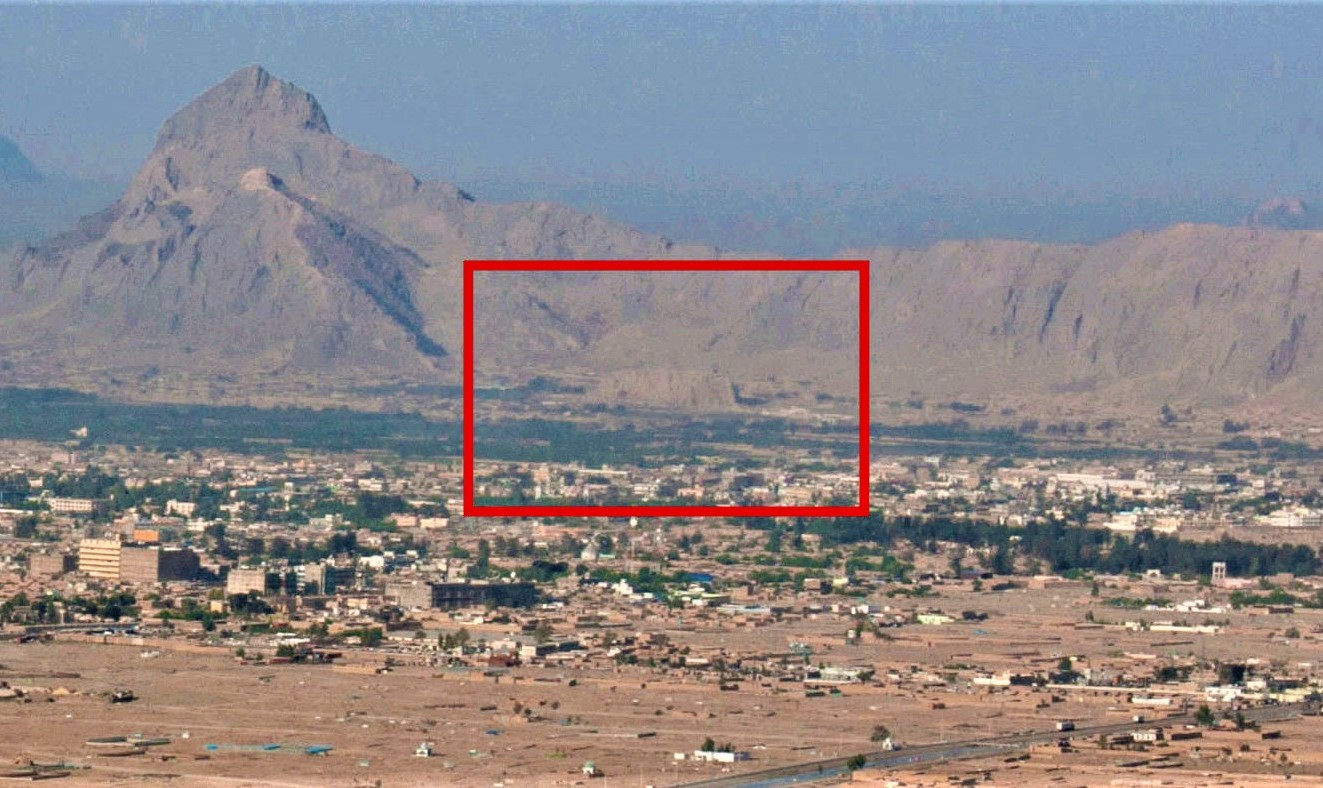
Ancient city of Old Kandahar (Alexandria Arachosia) (red) on the southwestern side of Kandahar

Location of Old Kandahar (Afghanistan)

Old Kandahar (locally known as Zorr Shaar, Pashto: زوړ ښار, lit. 'Old City'; also Shahr-i-Kona, Dari: شهر کهنه, meaning 'Old City') is a historical section of the city of Kandahar in southern Afghanistan.

== The citadel ==
It is widely believed that after conquering Mundigak in 330 BC, Alexander the Great marched southeast with his army and laid out what is now Old Kandahar and named it Alexandria. The site was likely chosen as a way to protect its inhabitant from the occasional heavy sandstorms coming from nearby Reg District (Sand District). Others suggest that the foundation of the citadel was probably laid out during the Iron Age, and became a major fortress of the Achaemenid Empire. It served as the local seat of power for many rulers in the last 2,000 years. The region became part of many empires, including the Mauryans (322 BC–185 BC), Indo-Scythians (200 BC–400 AD), Sassanids, Arabs, Zunbils, Saffarids, Ghaznavids, Ghorids, Timurids, Mughals, Safavids, Hotaks, and the Durranis. It was one of the main cities of Arachosia, a historical region sitting in Greater Iran's southeastern lands and was also in contact with the Indus Valley civilization. The city has been a frequent target for conquest because of its strategic location in Southern Asia and Central Asia, controlling the main trade route linking the Indian subcontinent with the Middle East, the rest of Central Asia and the Persian Gulf.

The city was often fought over by the Safavids and the Mughals until 1709, when Mirwais Hotak made the region an independent kingdom and turned Kandahar into the capital of the Hotak dynasty. The city was destroyed by Nader Shah in 1738 after defeating Hussain Hotak, the last Hotak ruler. After the destruction of this old city all the remaining inhabitants were relocated to a nearby area which became known as "Naderabad" for a short time, named after Nader Shah. By 1750, Ahmad Shah Durrani had laid out the current city of Kandahar and turned it into the capital of his Durrani Empire.

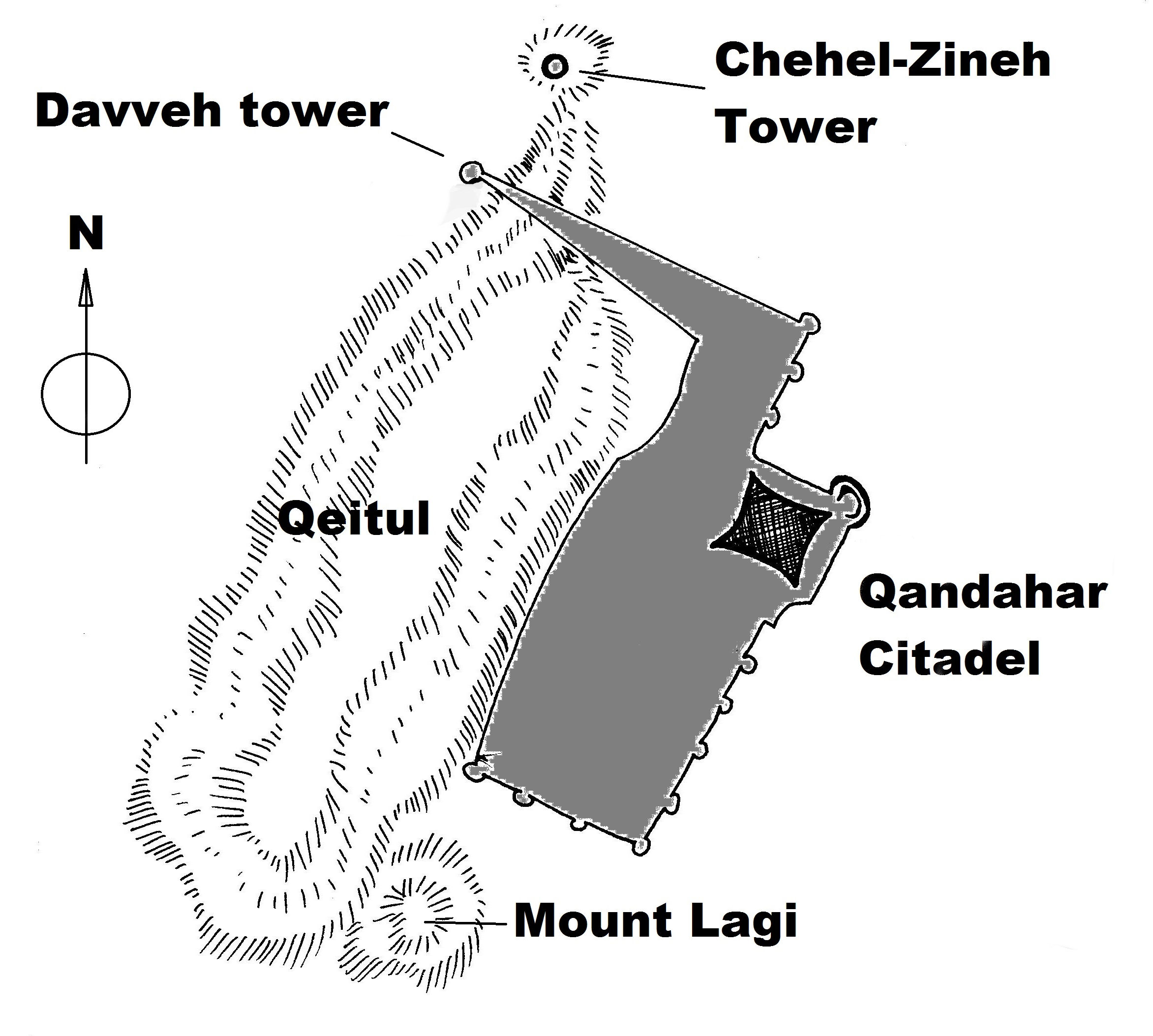
Plan of the citadel. This destroyed fortress is still standing today.

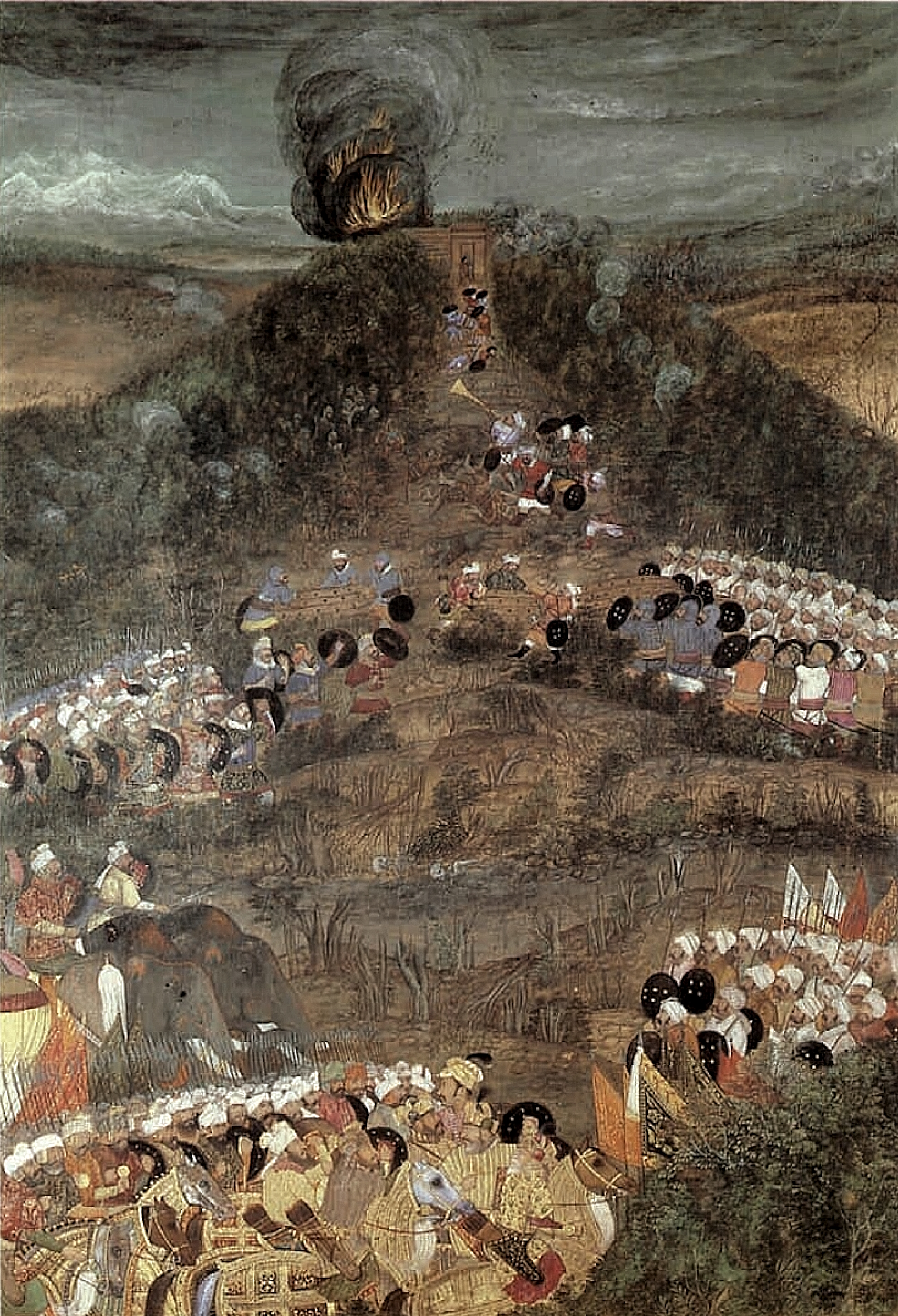
The failed Mughal Siege of Kandahar in 1649. Mughal, mid-17th century. Padshahnama.

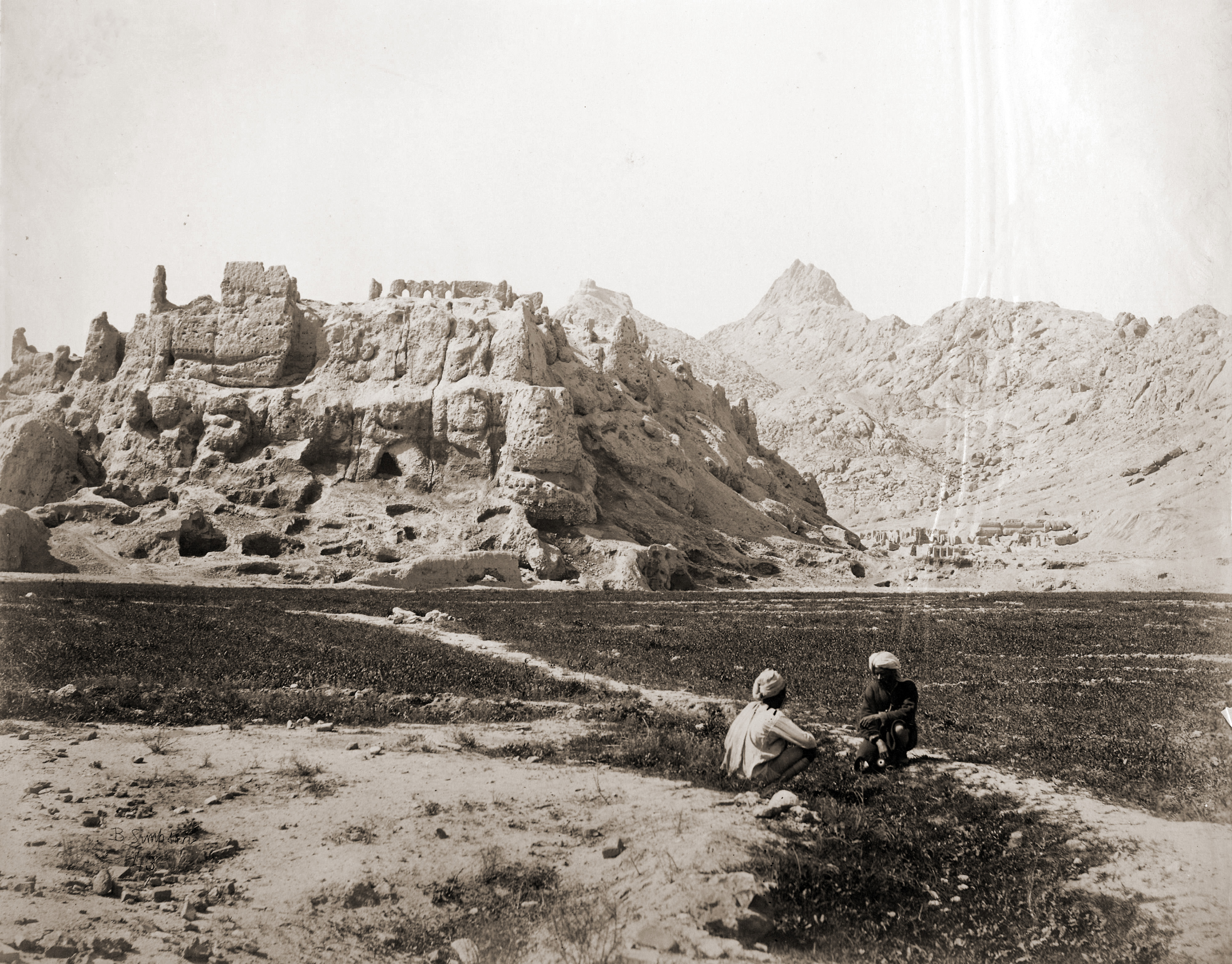
An 1881 photo showing the ruined Old Kandahar citadel of Shah Hussain Hotak that was destroyed by the Afsharid forces of Nader Shah Afshar in 1738.

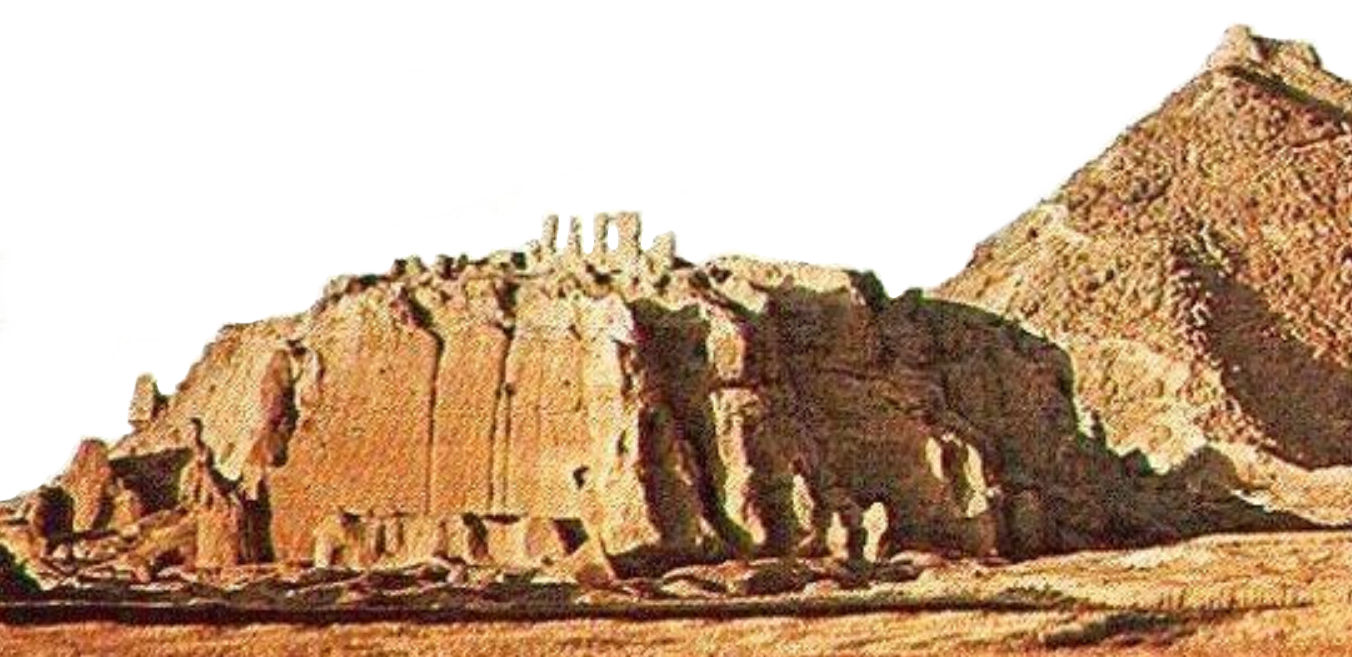
The citadel in 2018.

== Epigraphical discoveries ==
Important inscriptions in Greek, dating to the 3rd-2nd century BC were discovered in or around the site of Old Kandahar, including the Kandahar Greek Edicts of Ashoka, the Kandahar Bilingual Rock Inscription also from the time of the Indian ruler Ashoka, the Kandahar Sophytos Inscription and an inscription made by a son of Aristonax.

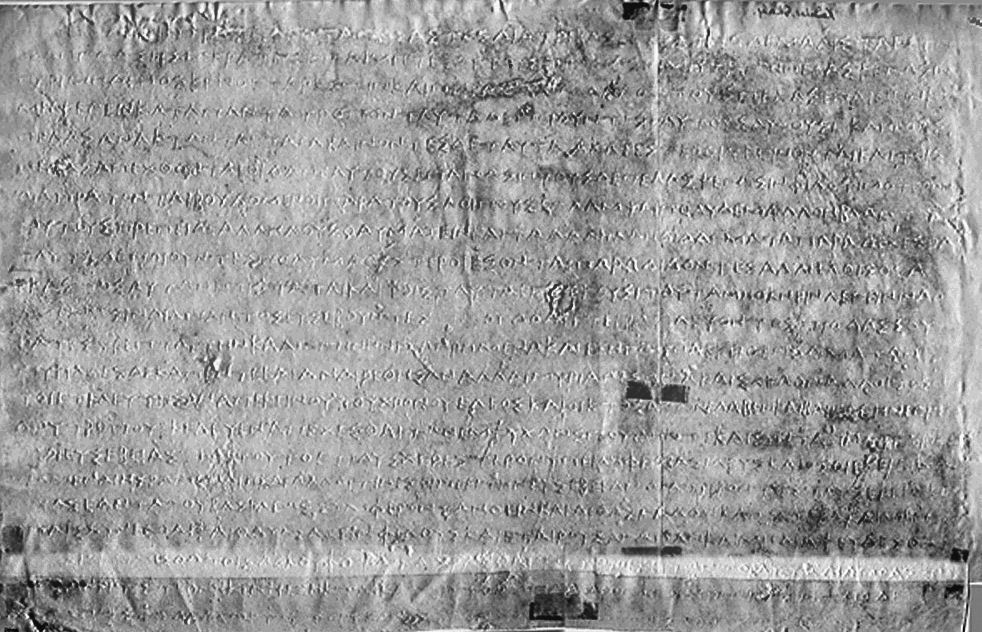
Kandahar Greek Edicts of Ashoka

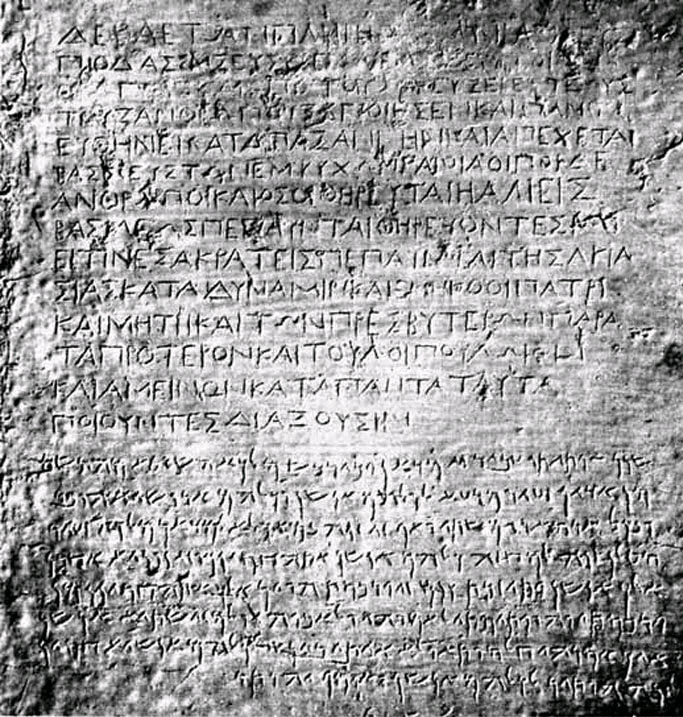
Kandahar Bilingual Rock Inscription

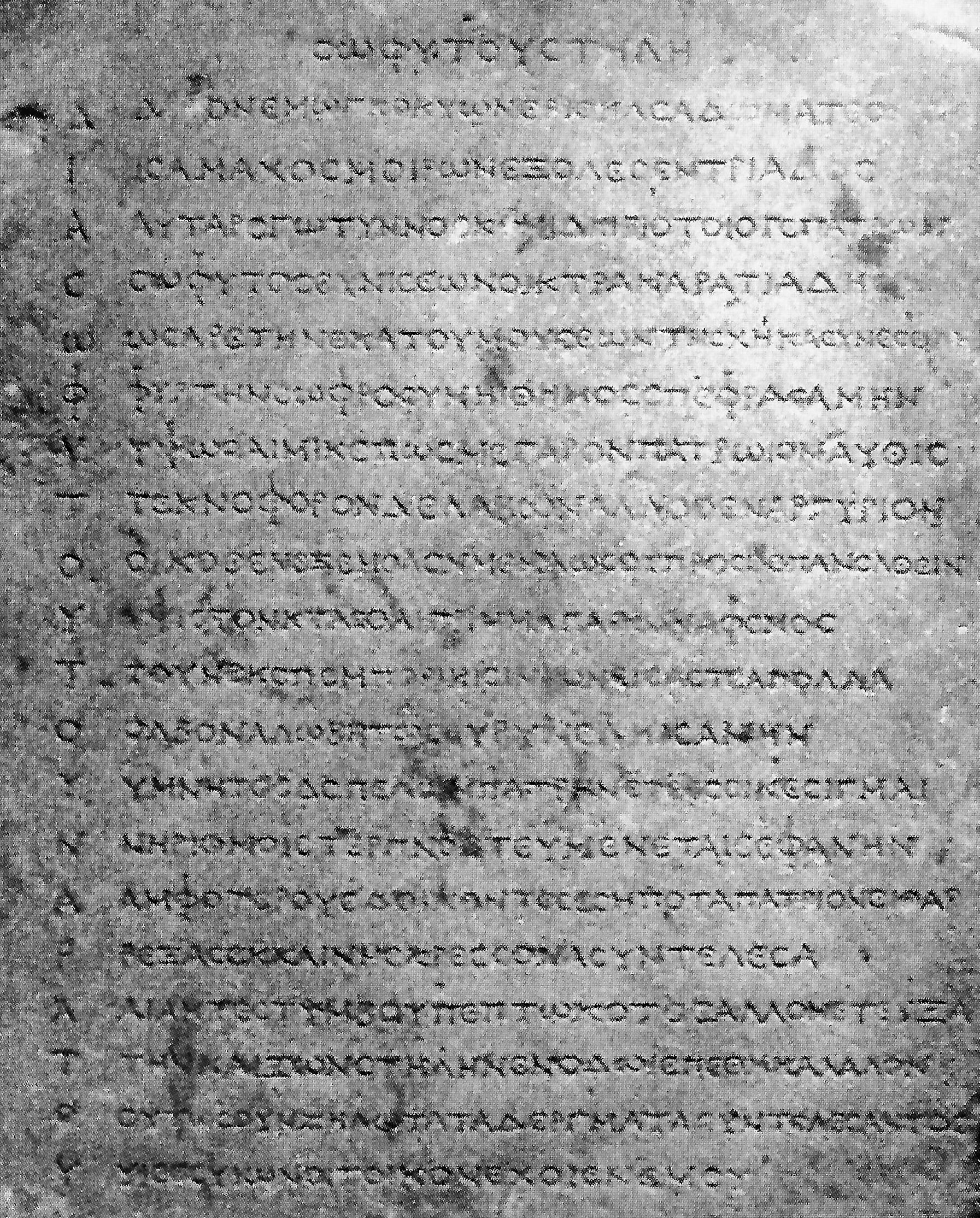
Sophytos Inscription written in Greek probably from Kandahar.

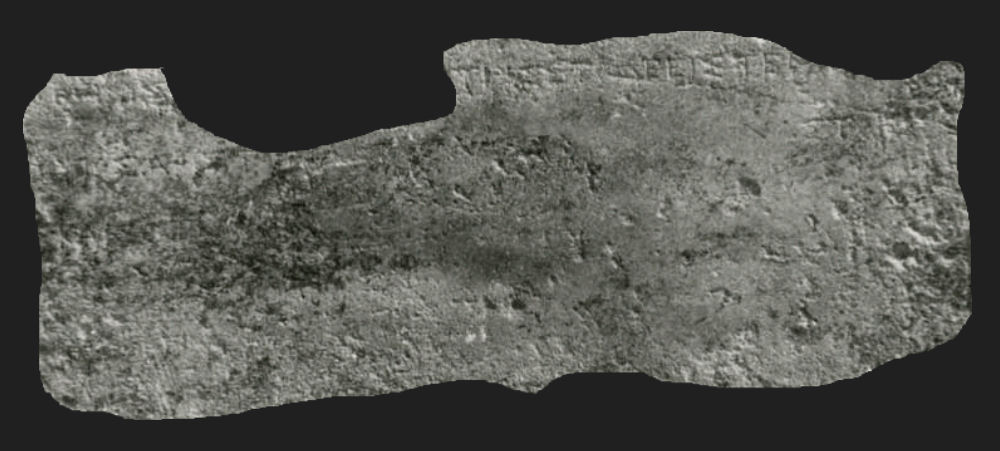
Remains of a Greek inscription written by a son of Aristonax.

== See also ==
- Kandahar
- Kandahar Province
