= Alexandria Arachosia =

Ancient Greek city, site of modern-day Kandahar, Afghanistan

- Ἀλεξάνδρεια Ἀραχωσίας (Greek)
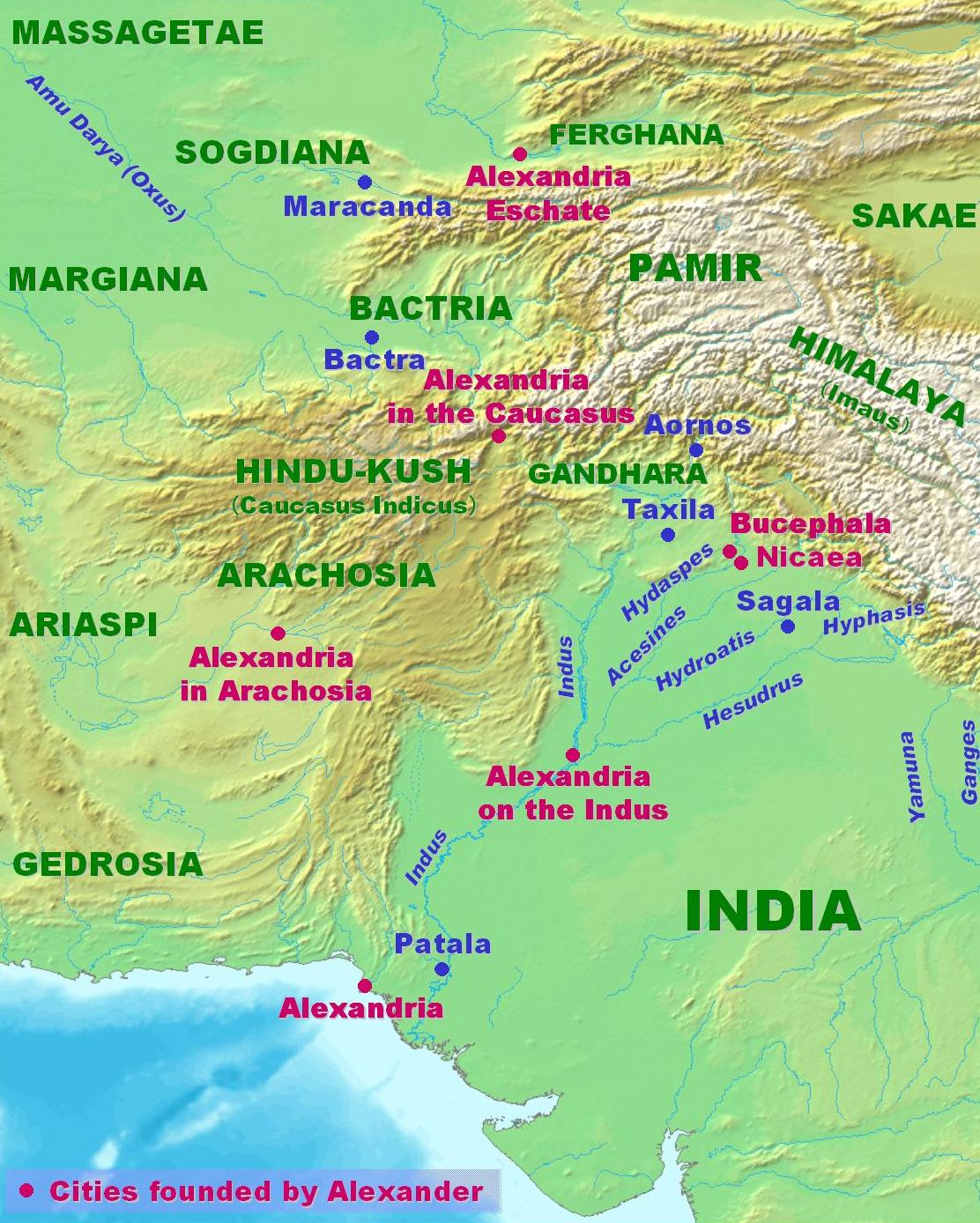
- Cities founded by Alexander the Great; Alexandria Arachosia is located center left.

- Location of Alexandria Arachosia
- 31°36′08″N 65°39′32″E
- Type: Settlement
- Location: Afghanistan
- Region: Kandahar Province
- Part of: Cities founded by Alexander the Great

History
- Built: 330–329 BC

Alexandria in Arachosia (Greek: Ἀλεξάνδρεια Ἀραχωσίας), also known as Alexandropolis (Ἀλεξανδρόπολις), was a city in ancient times that is now called Kandahar in Afghanistan. It was one of more than twenty cities founded or renamed by Alexander the Great. It was founded around 330 BC, on the foundations of an earlier Achaemenid fortress. Arachosia is the Greek name of an ancient province of the Achaemenid, Seleucid and Parthian empires. The province of Arachosia was centered around the Argandab valley in Kandahar. It did not reach the Hindu Kush, but it apparently extended east as far as the Indus River, although its exact extents are not yet clear.

== History ==
=== Background ===
The ancient region of Arachosia can be geographically defined as the territory within the drainage basins of the Helmand, Arghandab, Tarnak, and Arghestan rivers: in the north, it incorporated the area surrounding Ghazni; to the south, it was bordered by the Registan desert in the region of Gedrosia; in the west lay the border with Drangiana; and its eastern frontier probably lay at the Bolan Pass in Pakistan. Arachosia (Old Persian Harauvatiš) had been one of the most important regions of Afghanistan since the Bronze Age, when Helmand culture (c. 3300 – c. 2500 BC) was centred on the site of Mundigak. The area surrounding modern Kandahar rose in prominence during the early first millennium BC: the terminus post quem for a settlement on the site is c. 1000 BC, but analysis of pottery favours a later date of c. 700 BC. It is possible that immigrants to the region may have caused the decline of Mundigak and Kandahar's ascension—the latter's massive fortifications, with inner and outer defences and ramparts 14 metres (46 ft) wide, precede all other known cities in the Iranian or South Asian regions, but may be related to Central Asian Iron Age structures.

In the mid-sixth century BC, Arachosia fell under the control of the nascent Persian Achaemenid Empire; under their rule, the settlement at Kandahar was expanded and rebuilt so that it was divided into quarters by inner walls, while a large citadel was also constructed by hand. The site was probably the Achaemenid regional capital of Harauvatiš, as fragments of accounting tablets in the Elamite language which greatly resemble equivalent tablets at the Persian capital of Persepolis; some artefacts found in the Persepolis treasury, such as stone vessels and mortars and pestles, originated from Arachosia. The city at Kandahar may have begun to experience a decline around 400 BC.

=== Hellenistic era ===
Alexander the Great, king of Macedonia, launched an invasion of the Achaemenid Empire in 333 BC. Defeating King Darius III in the key battles of Issus (333 BC) and Gaugamela (331 BC), Alexander captured the major cities of Babylon, Susa, and Persepolis, and in 330 BC marched eastwards to confront the remaining Persian forces led by Bessus in Bactria. Alexander arrived in Arachosia in October, after dealing with an alleged conspiracy involving his general Philotas. His quick traverse of the region, which he left in late November, suggests that the Kandahar site was not strongly held, with Bessus having withdrawn eastwards. Alexander's chroniclers accordingly gave the region little prominence—in the words of the historian Peter Fraser, Arrian treated the region "almost as a grammatical afterthought". None of the five foremost ancient writers on Alexander (Arrian, Plutarch, Diodorus Siculus, Curtius Rufus, and Justin) mention that Alexander founded a city in Arachosia, and neither do the early Hellenistic geographers. A similar situation exists for most of the other minor cities founded by Alexander the Great.

References to a foundation are instead found in other classical sources. In his Parthian Stations, the geographer Isidore of Charax noted the existence of an "Ἀλεξανδρόπολις μητρόπολις Ἀραχωσίας" ("Alexandropolis, metropolis of Arachosia")—the "Alexandropolis" is probably a linguistic corruption of "Ἀλεξάνδρεια" (Alexandria). Similar references to an "Alexandria" in Arachosia are found in the works of Ptolemy, Ammianus Marcellinus, and Stephanus of Byzantium. Stephanus, Ptolemy, and Pliny the Elder also refer to a city called "Arachotoi" or "Arachotos"—presumably the local name for an Alexandria in Arachosia—while Pliny additionally cites Alexander's bematists (distance-measurers) Diognetos and Baiton, who refer to an "Arachosiorum oppidum” ("town of the Arachosians"). Alexander probably gave orders to refound the city while he was in Arachosia in late 330 BC or shortly afterwards; it is impossible to say where the garrison of 4,000 infantry and 600 cavalry he left behind in the region was located.

After the conquests of Alexander the Great, Arachosia was ruled by the Satrap Sybirtius. In the 3rd century BC, it is thought that the ambassador to the Indian court Megasthenes departed from the city to visit India:

Megasthenes lived with Sibyrtius, satrap of Arachosia, and often speaks of his visiting Sandracottus, the king of the Indians. Arrian, Anabasis Alexandri

=== Location ===
The remains of Alexandria in Arachosia are today found in the tell of Old Kandahar citadel in the western portion of the modern city. The citadel tell was excavated by the British Society for South Asian Studies through the 1970s and with the relative improvement in security from 2008 to 2009. These excavations indicate that the Islamic walls were based on those from classical times, indicating what might be a square (tetragonis) shaped town, but one highly modified by the unusual topography. A triangular-shaped portion of the tell adjoining the Greek town is from the Buddhist era. To date, no Greek buildings have been found, but numerous coins, inscriptions and graves have been.
