= Minor Rock Edicts =

Ancient rock inscriptions in India attributed to Mauryan emperor Ashoka

Minor Rock Edicts of Ashoka
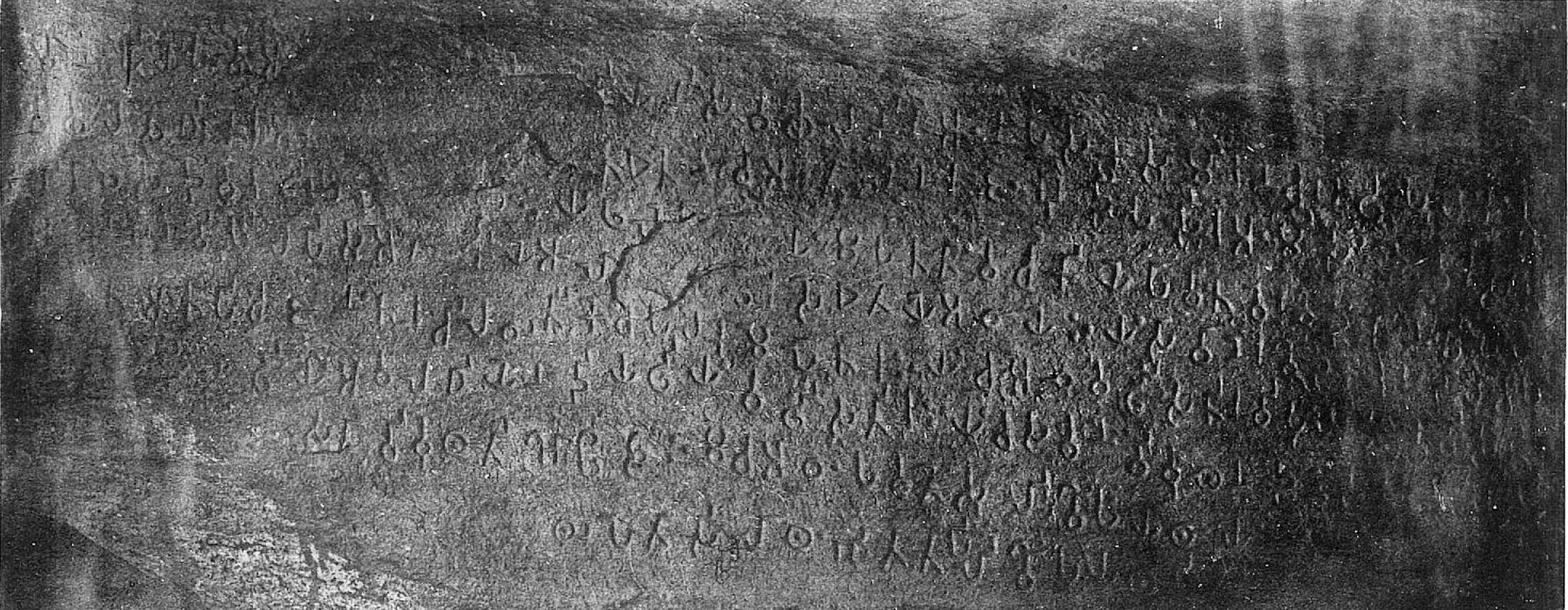
- Minor rock edict of Sasaram.
- Material: Rock, stone
- Created: 3rd century BCE
- Discovered: 1893
- Present location: India

Location
- Location of the Minor Rock Edicts (Edicts 1,2&3)

The Minor Rock Edicts of Ashoka (r. 269–233 BCE) are rock inscriptions which form the earliest part of the Edicts of Ashoka, and predate Ashoka's Major Rock Edicts. These are the first edicts in the Indian language of Emperor Ashoka, written in the Brahmi script in the 11th year of his reign. They follow chronologically the Kandahar Bilingual Rock Inscription, in Greek and in Aramaic, written in the 10th year of his reign (260 BCE), which is the first known inscription of Ashoka.

There are several slight variations in the content of these edicts, depending on location, but a common designation is usually used, with Minor Rock Edict N°1 (MRE1) and a Minor Rock Edict N°2 (MRE2), which does not appear alone but always in combination with Edict N°1), the different versions being generally aggregated in most translations. There is also a minor edict No.3, discovered in Bairat, for the Buddhist clergy.

The inscriptions of Ashoka in Greek or Aramaic are sometimes also categorized as "Minor Rock Edicts".

The Minor Pillar Edicts of Ashoka refer to five separate Edicts inscribed on columns, the Pillars of Ashoka. These edicts are preceded chronologically by the Minor Rock Edicts and may have been made in parallel with the Major Rock Edicts.

== Chronology ==
The Minor Rock Edict were written quite early in the reign of Ashoka, from the 11th year of his reign at the earliest (according to his own inscription, "two and a half years after becoming a secular Buddhist", i.e. two and a half years at least after the Kalinga conquest of the eighth year of his reign, which is the starting point for his gradual conversion to Buddhism). The technical quality of the engraving of the inscriptions is generally very poor, and generally very inferior to the pillar edicts dated to the years 26 and 27 of Ashoka's reign.

The Minor Rock Edicts therefore follow the very first inscription of Ashoka, written in year 10 of his reign, the Kandahar Bilingual Rock Inscription established at Chilzina, Kandahar, in the center of Afghanistan. This first inscription was written in Classical Greek and Aramaic exclusively.

The Minor Rock Edicts maybe slightly earlier than the Major Rock Edicts established to propagate the Dharma, from the 12th year of Ashoka's reign. These Ashoka inscriptions are in Indian languages with the exception of the Kandahar Greek Edict of Ashoka inscribed on a limestone stele. It was only later, during the 26th and 27th years of his reign, that Ashoka wrote new edicts, this time on majestic columns, the pillars of Ashoka.

== Text of the Minor Rock Edicts ==
The different variations of edicts on rock 1 and 2 are usually presented in the form of a compilation. There is also a minor edict on Rock No.3, discovered in Bairat only, addressing not the Ashoka officers as the first two edicts, but the Buddhist clergy, with the recommendation to study a very specific list of Buddhist scriptures.

In the Minor Rock Edicts, Ashoka makes explicit mention of his religious affiliation by presenting himself as a "lay disciple" or "disciple of the Buddha" according to the versions, and speaking of his proximity to "the order" (samgha), which is far from the case in most other edicts where he is only promulgating the moral laws of "Dharma".

Association of Ashoka with the title "Devanampriya" ("Beloved-of-the-Gods")

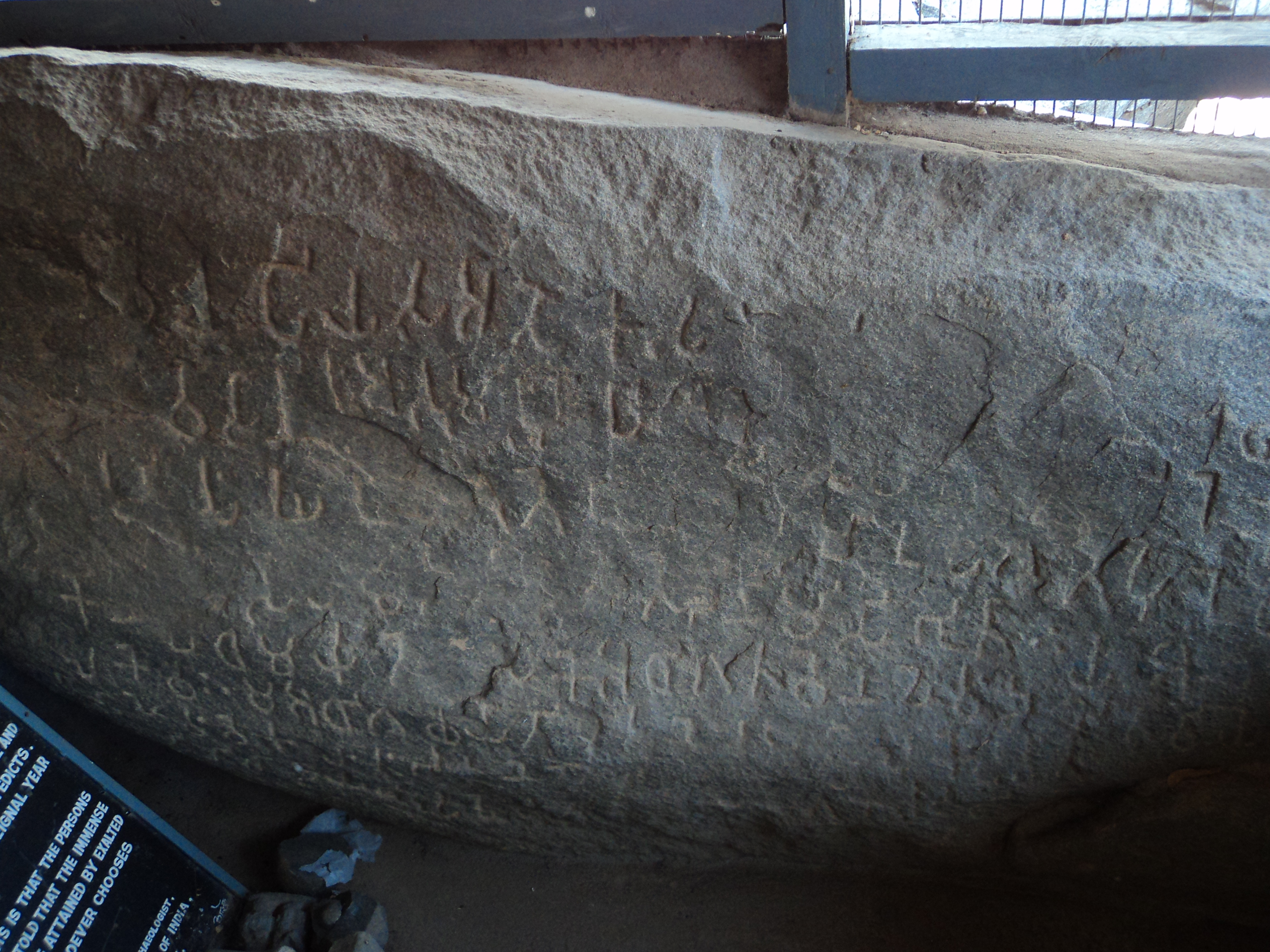
The Maski inscription confirmed the association of the title "Devanampriya" with "Asoka", both readable in the first line.

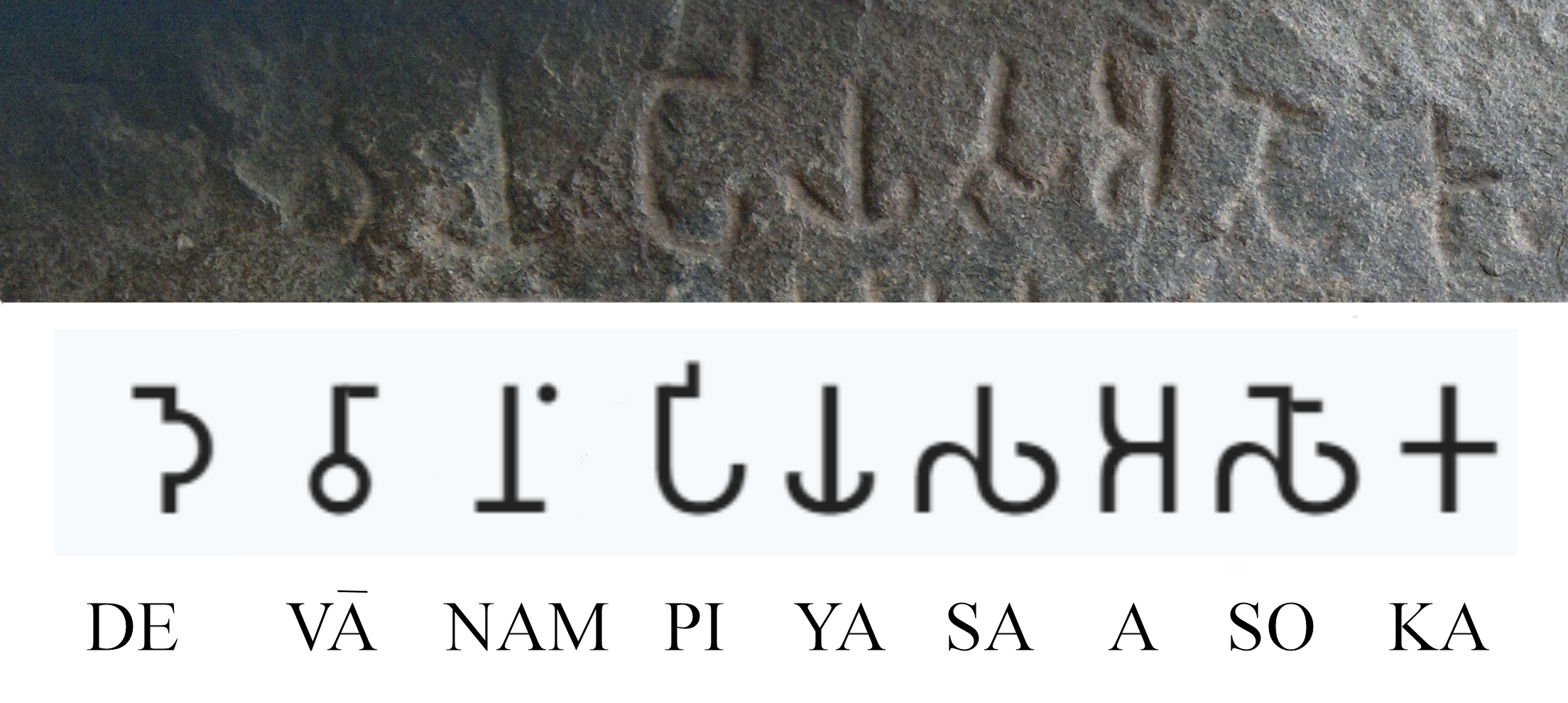
"Devānaṃpiyasa Asoka", honorific Devanampiya ("Beloved of the God", in the adjectival form -sa) and name of Ashoka, in Brahmi script, in the Maski Edict of Ashoka.

There are slight variations between each of the versions of the Minor Rock Edicts. The Maski version of Minor Rock Edict No.1 was historically especially important in that it confirmed the association of the honorific title "Devanampriya" with Ashoka:

[A proclamation] of Devanampriya Asoka.
Two and a half years [and somewhat more] (have passed) since I am a Buddha-Sakya.
[A year and] somewhat more (has passed) [since] I have visited the Samgha and have shown zeal.
Those gods who formerly had been unmingled (with men) in Jambudvipa, have how become mingled (with them).
This object can be reached even by a lowly (person) who is devoted to morality.
One must not think thus, — (viz.) that only an exalted (person) may reach this.
Both the lowly and the exalted must be told : "If you act thus, this matter (will be) prosperous and of long duration, and will thus progress to one and a half.

— Maski Minor Rock Edict of Ashoka.

In the Gujarra Minor Rock Edict also, the name of Ashoka is used together with his titles: "Devanampiya Piyadasi Asokaraja".

Pre-existence of pillars

In the Minor Rock Edicts, Ashoka also mentions the duty to inscribe his edicts on the rocks and on the pillars ("wherever there is a pillar or rock"). This has led some authors, especially John Irwin, to think that there were already pillars in India before Ashoka erected them. For John Irwin, examples today of these pillars prior to Ashoka would be the bull pillar of Rampurva, the elephant pillar of Sankissa, and the Allahabad pillar of Ashoka. None of these pillars received the inscription of the Minor Rock Edicts, and only the pillar of Allahabad has inscriptions of Ashoka, which weakens this theory, since, according to the orders of the same of Ashoka, they should have been engraved with his Minor Rock Edicts.

Language of the edicts

Several edicts of Ashoka are known in Greek and Aramaic; by contrast the many minor edicts on rock engraved in southern India in Karnataka use the Prakrit of the North as the language of communication, with the Brahmi script, and not the local Dravidian idiom, which can be interpreted as a kind of intrusion and authoritarianism in respect to the southern territories.

=== Full texts of the Minor Rock Edicts ===
Minor Rock Edict No.1

In this Edict, Ashoka describes himself as a Buddhist layman (Upāsaka) /a Buddha-Śaka /a Saka, and also explains he has been getting closer to the Sangha and has become more ardent in the faith.

Minor Rock Edict No.1 (conflated versions)
English translation	Prakrit in Brahmi script
From Suvarnagiri, on the order of His Highness the Prince, and the officers: good health to the officers of Isila who are to be instructed thus: Thus speaks the Beloved of the Gods, Asoka: I have been a Buddhist layman (Upāsaka) /a Buddha-Śaka /a Saka for more than two and a half years, but for a year I did not make much progress. Now for more than a year I have drawn closer to the Order (Sangha) and have become more ardent. The gods, who in India up to this time did not associate with men, now mingle with them, and this is the result of my efforts. Moreover this is not something to be obtained only by the great, but it is also open to the humble, if they are earnest and they can even reach heaven easily. This is the reason for this announcement that both humble and great should make progress and that the neighbouring peoples also should know that the progress is lasting, And this investment will increase and increase abundantly, and increase to half as much again. This matter must be inscribed here and elsewhere on the hills, and wherever there is a stone pillar it is to be engraved on that pillar. You must go out with this document throughout the length and breadth of your district. This announcement has been proclaimed while on tour; 256 nights have been spent on tour. — Adapted from Romilla Thapar, A translation of the Edicts of Ashoka p.259	Minor Rock Edict No.1 in Sasaram. The word Upāsaka ("Buddhist lay follower"), used by Ashoka to describe himself, in most versions of his Minor Rock Edict No.1.

Minor Rock Edict No.2

Only appears in a few places, in conjunction with Minor Edict No.1

Minor Rock Edict No.2 (conflated versions)
English translation	Prakrit in Brahmi script
Thus says the Beloved of the Gods. Whatever the Beloved of the Gods orders must be carried out in every respect. The rajuka [rural officer] is to be instructed and he will instruct the people of the countryside, assembling them with the sound of the drum; likewise the local chiefs. Obey mother and father, obey the teachers, have mercy on living beings; speak the truth. These virtues of Dhamma should be followed. Thus you will instruct them on the orders of the Beloved of the Gods, and also you will ensure that elephant trainers, clerks, fortune-tellers, and Brahmans instruct their apprentices according to ancient tradition, that they should honour their masters.... righteous masters. In a family relatives must treat each other with respect. This is the ancient custom, conducive to long life, and thus it must be carried out. Carved by the engraver Capada. — Adapted from Romilla Thapar, A translation of the Edicts of Ashoka p.259	Minor Rock Edicts 1&2 in Siddapur.

Minor Rock Edict No.3

Only appears at Bairat, where it was discovered in front of the Bairat Temple, possibly the oldest free-standing temple in India. The Edict is now located in the Museum of The Asiatic Society, Calcutta, and because of this is sometimes called the "Calcutta-Bairāṭ inscription". Also known as the Bhabru Edict. Ashoka claims "great is my reverence and faith in the Buddha, the Dharma (and) the Samgha", and makes a list of recommended Buddhist scriptures that Buddhist monks as well as the laity should repeatedly study.

Minor Rock Edict No. 3
English translation	Prakrit in Brahmi script
The Magadhan King Priyadarsin, having saluted the Samgha hopes they are both well and comfortable. It is known to you, Sirs, how great is my reverence and faith in the Buddha, the Dharma (and) the Samgha. Whatsoever, Sirs, has been spoken by the blessed Buddha, all that is quite well spoken. But, Sirs, what would indeed appear to me (to be referred to by the words of the scripture): "thus the true Dharma will be of long duration", that I feel bound to declare: The following expositions of the Dharma, Sirs, (viz.) the Vinaya-Samukasa ("The Exaltation of Discipline"), the Aliya-vasas ("The Ideal Mode of Life"), the Anagata-bhayas ("Fears to Come"), the Muni-gathas ("The Songs of the Hermit"), the Moneya-Suta ("Discourse on the Hermit Life"), the Upatisa-pasina ("The Questions of Upatishya"), and the Laghulovada ("The Sermon to Rahula") which was spoken by the blessed Buddha concerning falsehood, — I desire, Sirs, that many groups of monks and (many) nuns may repeatedly listen to these expositions of the Dharma and may reflect (on them). In the same way both laymen and laywomen (should act). For the following (purpose), Sirs, am I causing this to be written, (viz.) in order that they may know my intention. — Adapted from Inscriptions of Asoka. New Edition by E. Hultzsch 1925 p.172 Public Domain	Minor Rock Edict No.3, from Bairat only. Rubbing of Minor Rock Edict No.3, from Bairat only.

== Locations ==
The minor rock edicts of Ashoka are exclusively inscribed on rock. They are located throughout the Indian subcontinent. Edict N°1 appears alone in Panguraria, Maski, Palkigundu et Gavimath, Bahapur/Srinivaspuri, Bairat, Ahraura, Gujarra, Sasaram, Rajula Mandagiri, Rupnath, Ratampurwa and in conjunction with Edict N°2 at Yerragudi, Udegolam, Nittur, Brahmagiri, Siddapur, Jatinga-Rameshwara.

The traditional Minor Rock Edicts (excluding the miscellaneous inscriptions in Aramaic or Greek found in Pakistan and Afghanistan) are located in central and southern India, whereas the Major Rock Edicts were located at the frontiers on Ashoka's territory.

Minor Rock Edicts of Ashoka
Name	Location	Map	Overview	Rock	Rubbing / Close-up
Bahapur	Location of Srinivaspuri near Kalkaji Temple, in the Kailash Colony, near the Bahapur area, South Delhi; Minor rock edict # 1 only. 28.55856°N 77.25662°E Local 3D view	Bahapur is located in India			
Gujarra	Near Jhansi, Datia district, Madhya Pradesh. Minor rock edict # 1 only./>Here, the name of Ashoka is used together with his titles: "Devanampiya Piyadasi Asokaraja".Full inscription/25.57699°N 78.54594°E Inscription "Devanampiyasa Piyadasino Asokaraja".	Gujarra is located in India			
Saru Maru/ Panguraria	Sehore District, Madhya Pradesh. Minor rock edict # 1 only 22.729949°N 77.519910°E In Saru Maru/Panguraria there is also a commemorative inscription referring to the visit of Ashoka as a young man, while he was still viceroy of Madhya Pradesh: Piyadasi nama rajakumala va samvasamane imam desam papunitha vihara(ya)tay(e) The king, who (now after consecration) is called "Piyadasi", (once) came to this place for a pleasure tour while still a (ruling) prince, living together with his unwedded consort. — Commemorative Inscription of the visit of Ashoka, Saru Maru. Translated by Falk.	Saru Maru is located in India		Rock Edict No.1.	Commemorative inscription.
Udegolam	Bellary District, Karnataka. Minor rock edict n°1 and n°2 15.52000°N 76.83361°E	Udegolam is located in India			
Nittur	Bellary District, Karnataka. Minor rock edicts #1 and #2; 15.54717°N 76.83270°E	Nittur is located in India			
Maski	Maski, Raichur district, Karnataka. Minor rock edict #1 only "[A proclamation] of Devanampriya Asoka." "Two and a half year [and somewhat more] (have passed) since I am a Buddha-Sakya..." Full inscription 15.95723°N 76.64122°E	Maski is located in India			
Siddapur	Near Brahmagiri, Karnataka (14°48'49" N 76°47'58" E). Minor rock edicts # 1 and #2; Full inscription 14.81361°N 76.79944°E	Siddapur is located in India			
Brahmagiri	Chitradurga district, Karnataka. Minor rock edicts n°1 and n°2 Full inscription 14.81361°N 76.80611°E	Brahmagiri is located in India			.
Jatinga-Rameshwara	Near Brahmagiri, Karnataka. Minor rock edicts n°1 and n°2 Full inscription 14.84972°N 76.79083°E	Jatinga-Rameshwara is located in India			.
Palkigundu and Gavimath	Main article: Palkigundu and Gavimath, Koppal Palkigundu and Gavimath (also called "Gavi Matha Koppal"), Koppal district, Karnataka. Minor rock edict #1 only 15.34416°N 76.13694°E; 15.33729°N 76.16213°E	Pakilgundu is located in India Gavimath is located in India			
Rajula Mandagiri	Near Pattikonda, Kurnool district, Andhra Pradesh. Minor rock edict #1 only 15.43500°N 77.47166°E	RajulaMandagiri is located in India			
Yerragudi	Gooty, near Guntakal, Anantapur, Andhra Pradesh. Minor rock edicts n°1 and n°2. The Major Rock Edicts are also present here. 15.20995°N 77.57688°E	Yerragudi is located in India			
Sasaram / Sahasram	Rohtas District, Bihar. The edict is located near the top of the terminal spur of the Kimur Range near Sasaram. Minor rock edict #1 only "...And where there are stone pillars here in my dominion, there also cause it to be engraved." Full inscription 24.94138°N 84.03833°E The name Jambudīpasi for "India" (Brahmi script) in the Sahasram Minor Rock Edict of Ashoka, circa 250 BCE.	Sasaram is located in India			
Rupnath	On Kaimur Hills near Jabalpur, Madhya Pradesh; ASI page "Two and a half years [and somewhat more] (have passed) since I am openly a Sakya..." Full inscription 23.64083°N 80.03194°E	Rupnath is located in India	Image		
Bairat	Found on a very large rock, on the hill north of Bairat, Rajasthan. Minor rock edict #1 only Full inscription 27.45188°N 76.18499°E	Bairat is located in India			
Calcutta/Bairat	An inscription found on the hill about one mile southwest of Bairat, Rajasthan, on a block of granite on the platform between the Bairat Temple and the large cannon-shaped rock in front of it. The edict was discovered by Captain Burt in 1840, and transferred to the Museum of the Asiatic Society of Bengal at Calcutta, hence the name "Calcutta-Bairat", also called the Bhabra or Bhabru Edict. Contains Minor rock edict #3 only, in which Ashoka gives a list of Buddhist scriptures to study. "...It is known to you Sirs, how great is my faith and reverence in the Buddha, the Dharma and the Sangha..." Full inscription In this inscription, Ashoka is referred to as "Piyadasi Raja Magadhe" ("Piyadasi, king of Magadha"). 27.417124°N 76.162569°E	Bairat is located in India		Modern image in the Asiatic Society	
Ahraura	Mirzapur District, Uttar Pradesh. Minor rock edict #1 only 25.02000°N 83.02000°E	Ahraura is located in India	Image		
Ratampurwa	Kaimur District, Bihar. Identical to the Sasaram rock edict. 25.018067°N 83.341657°E	Ratampurwa is located in India	Images		

== Miscellaneous inscriptions often catalogued in the Minor Rock Edicts ==
Some Ashoka inscriptions in Greek or Aramaic, or the inscriptions of the Barabar Caves, are difficult to categorize, and are sometimes included in the "Minor Rock Edicts".

This is sometimes also the case with the Kandahar Bilingual Rock Inscription (the designation of "Minor Rock Edict No.4" was proposed), although its nature is quite different from other edicts and it is the oldest of Ashoka's inscriptions (10th year of his reign).

The inscriptions in Aramaic, especially the Aramaic Inscription of Laghman and the Aramaic Inscription of Taxila are also often catalogued among the minor rock edicts, although their character of edict is not very clear, and if the first was inscribed on rock, the second was inscribed on an octagonal marble pillar.

The inscriptions of the Barabar Caves are purely dedicatory, without moral content.

Inscriptions often included in the "Minor Rock Edicts"
Name	Location	Map	Overview	Rock	Rubbing/ Close-up
Kandahar Bilingual Rock Inscription	Chil-Zena Hill, Kandahar, Afghanistan; Original bilingual Greek-Aramaic edition, sort of a summary or introduction of the Edicts of Ashoka. Sometimes categorized as "Minor Rock Edict No. 4", due to its more recent discovery, although it is the oldest of all Ashoka inscriptions (year 10 of his reign). Two Major Rock Edicts, the Kandahar Greek Edict of Ashoka, were also discovered in Kandahar.	Kandahar is located in South Asia			
Aramaic Inscription of Laghman	Valley of Laghman, Afghanistan; Short moral injunction accompanied by information for the journey to Palmyra.	Laghman is located in South Asia			
Aramaic Inscription of Taxila	Greek city of Sirkap, Taxila, Pakistan. Not perfectly identified inscription, engraved on a marble architectural block, mentioning "Our Lord Priyadasi" (Ashoka) twice .	Taxila is located in South Asia			
Inscriptions of Ashoka (caves of Barabar)	Barabar Caves, Bihar	Barabar is located in South Asia			
