= Palkigundu and Gavimath, Koppal =

Ancient rock inscriptions in India

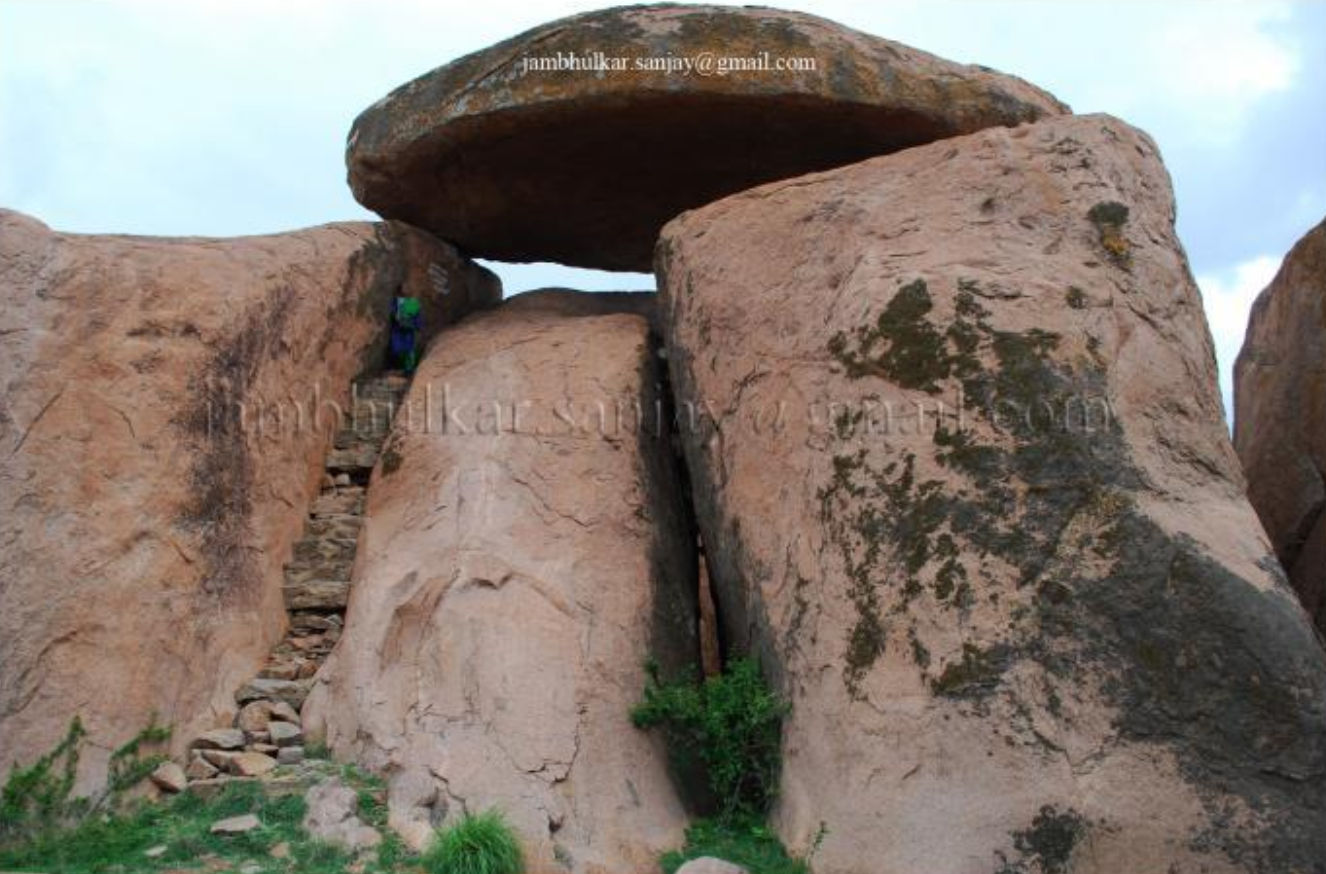
Rock of the inscription of Ashoka, at Palkigundu.

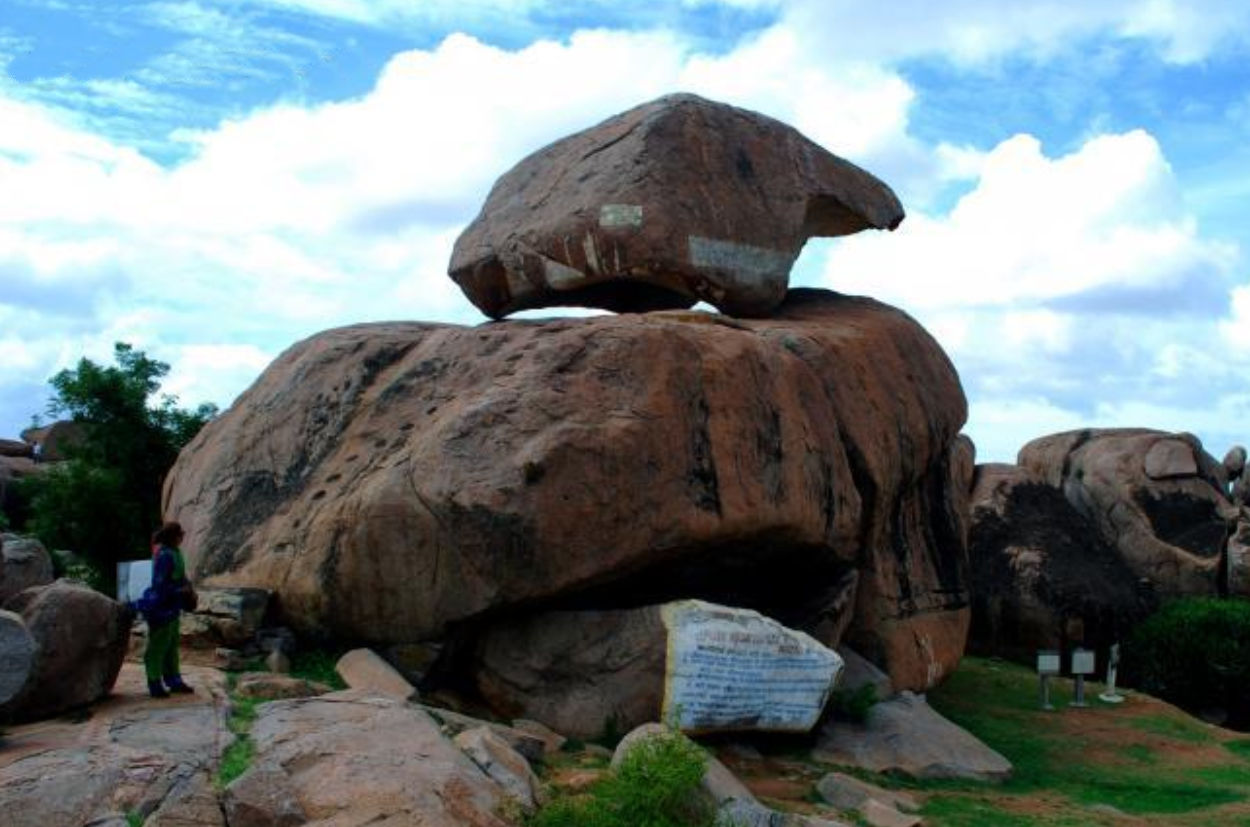
Rock of the inscription of Ashoka, at Gavimath.

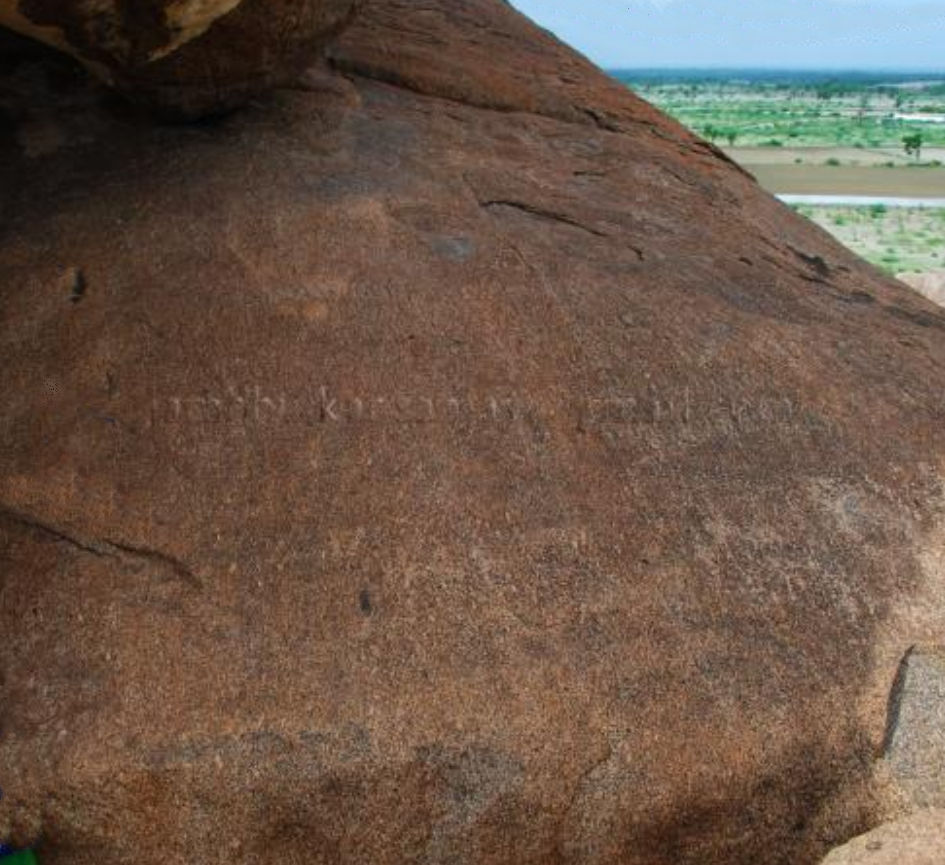
Detail of the Gavimath inscription.

Palkigundu (15.344167°N 76.136944°E) and Gavimath (15.3372926°N 76.1621377°E) near Koppal in Karnataka are two locations where inscriptions of Emperor Ashoka (304–232 BCE) were found. These inscriptions represent some of India's oldest written records, and are part of Ashoka's Minor Rock Edicts. Jain monks used to meditate there. The Palkigundu and Gavimath edicts are in Prakrit, written in Brahmi script. A Kannada translation of the inscriptions is available.

At Palkigundu (palanquin rock), two huge boulders are topped with a flat-shaped rock forming a canopy. Rough steps lead to the top of the boulders, where a 2,300-year-old inscription is located. Similar edicts have been found in 17 places in India.

About 2.5 km to the southeast of Palkigundu, at Gavimath, there is another rock inscription, also an edict from Ashoka. The Gavimath inscription is situated on a boulder in a sheltered place with a rock canopy. Jain monks used both Gavimath and Palkigundu as locations to meditate.

== Ashoka Edicts at Palkigundu ==
The rock edicts written in Brahmi script, talk about Ashoka becoming closer to the Sangha and becoming more ardent. Further it says any person, small or big, can achieve something if they put the effort.

== See also ==
- List of Edicts of Ashoka - Minor Rock Edicts
- Edicts of Ashoka
- Maski
- Kanaganahalli
- Sannati
