= Aramaic inscription of Taxila =

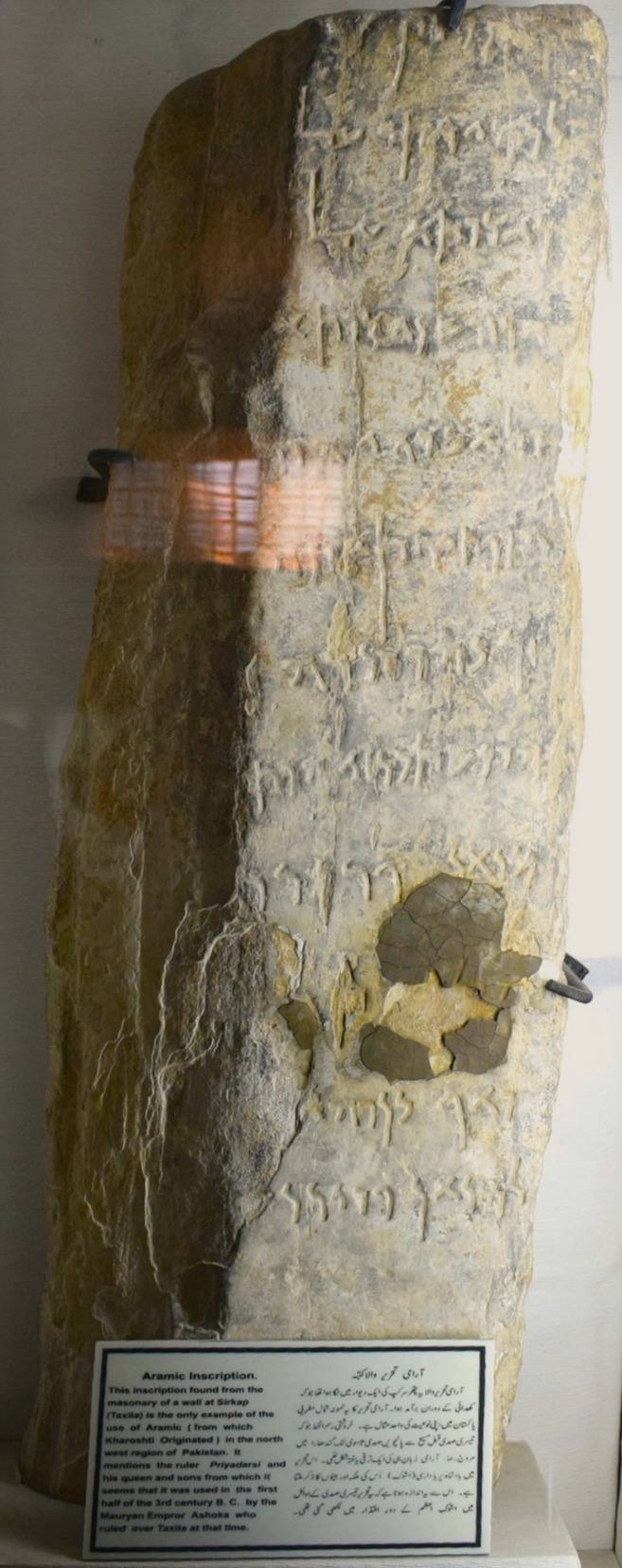
- Aramaic inscription of Taxila.
- Material: Portion of octagonal marble pillar.
- Size: 200px
- Writing: Aramaic
- Created: circa 260 BCE
- Period/culture: 3rd Century BCE
- Discovered: 33.7561N 72.8292E
- Place: Sirkap, Taxila, Pakistan
- Present location: Taxila Museum, Pakistan

Location
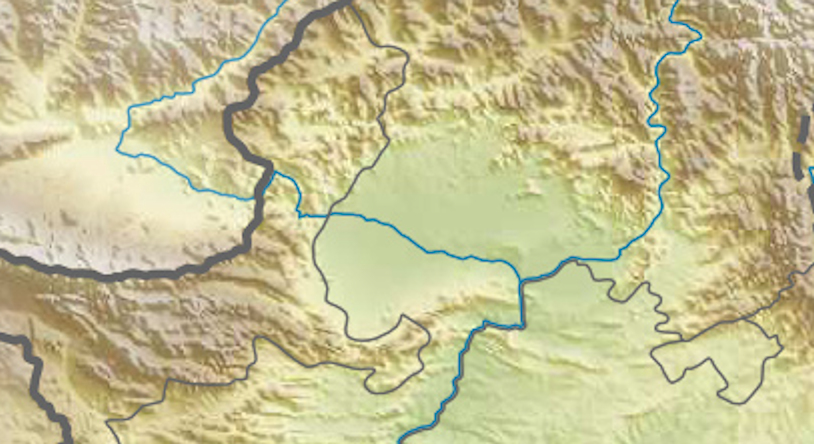
- Location of the Aramaic Inscription of Taxila. Aramaic inscription of Taxila (Pakistan) Aramaic inscription of Taxila (Gandhara)

The Aramaic inscription of Taxila is an inscription on a piece of marble, originally belonging to an octagonal column, discovered by Sir John Marshall in 1915 at Taxila, British India. The inscription is written in Aramaic, probably by the Mauryan emperor Ashoka around 260 BCE, and often categorized as one of the Minor Rock Edicts. Since Aramaic was the official language of the Achaemenid Empire, which disappeared in 330 BCE with the conquests of Alexander the Great, it seems that this inscription was addressed directly to the populations of this ancient empire still present in northwestern India, or to border populations for which Aramaic remained the normal communication language. The inscription is known as KAI 273.

== Related inscriptions ==
The discovery of this inscription was followed by that of several other inscriptions in Aramaic or Greek (or both), written by Asoka. The most famous are the Kandahar Bilingual Rock Inscription, written in Greek and Aramaic, or the Kandahar Greek Edict of Ashoka, also found in Kandahar. In 1932 another inscription in Aramaic was discovered in the Laghman Valley at Pul-i-Darunteh, then in 1963 an inscription in "Indo-Aramaic" alternating the Indian language and the Aramaic language, but using only the Aramaic script, the Aramaic parts translating the Indian parts transcribed in the Aramaic alphabet, also found in Kandahar. Finally, another inscription was found in Laghman, the Aramaic Inscription of Laghman.

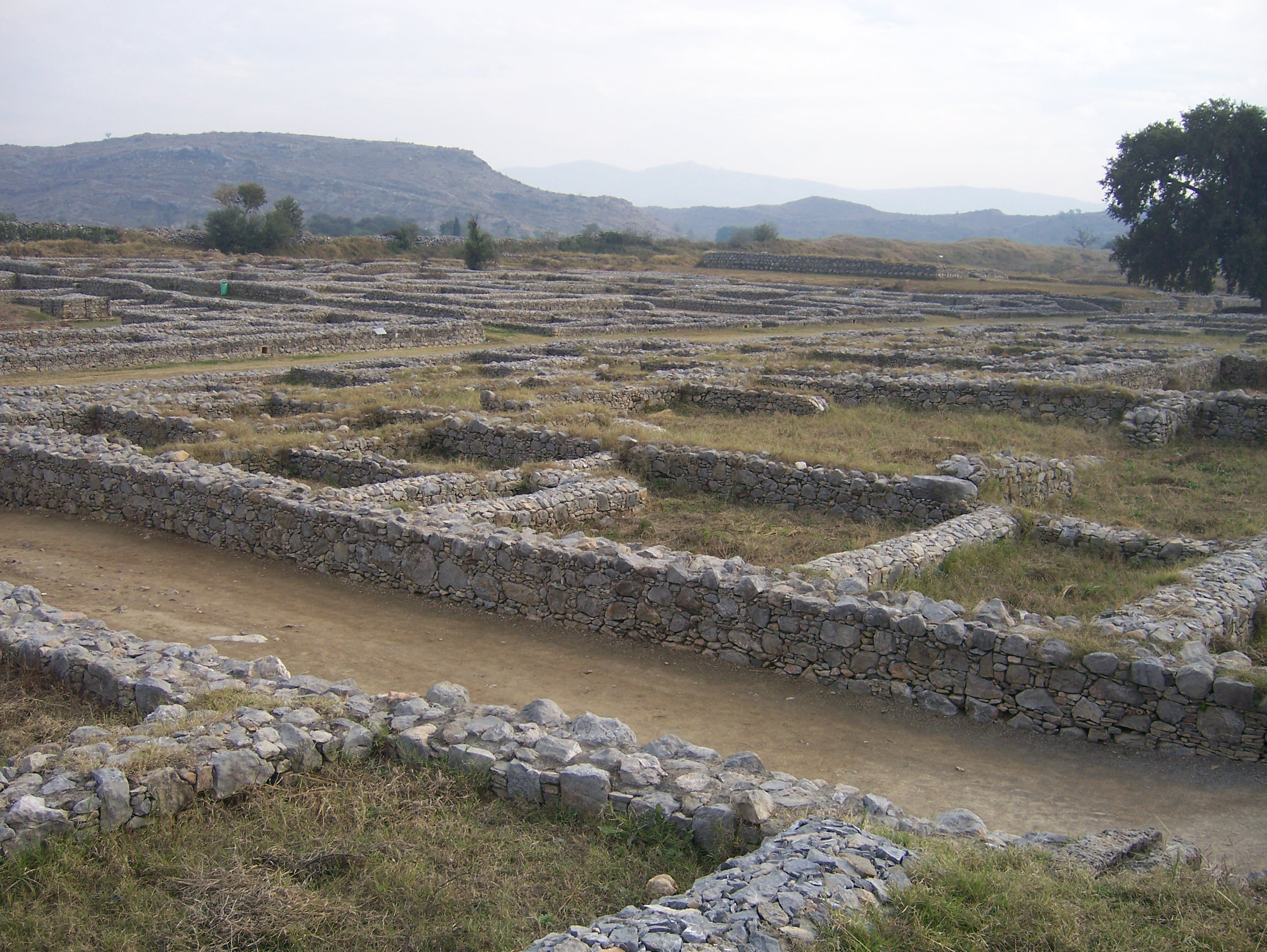
Ruins of the city of Sirkap.

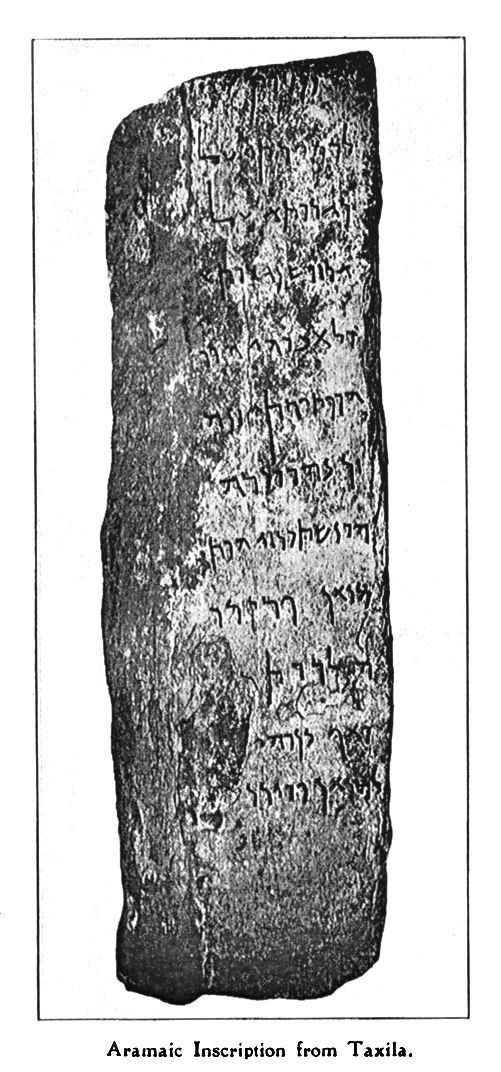
Another image of the inscription.

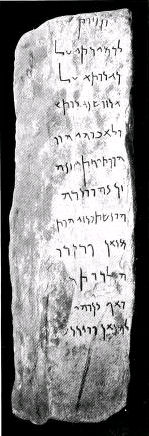
Another image of the inscription

== Text of the inscription ==
The text of the inscription is very fragmentary, but it has been established that it contains twice, lines 9 and 12, the mention of MR'N PRYDRŠ ("our lord Priyadasi"), the characteristic title used by Ashoka. The fragments w lʾbwhy "and to his father", wʾp bnwhy "and also his sons", and hwptysty "good obedience" are also easily interpreted, and they are reminiscent of the fragments found in the Aramaic part of the Kandahar Bilingual Rock Inscription.

The Aramaic Inscription of Taxila.
Object	Line	Original (Aramaic alphabet)	Transliteration	Possible interpretations
Sirkap Aramaic inscription 4th century BC (text)	1	𐡆𐡊𐡓𐡅𐡕𐡀	zkrwtʾ	"...memorial..." (?)
Sirkap Aramaic inscription 4th century BC (text)	2	𐡋 𐡃𐡌𐡉𐡃𐡕𐡉 𐡏𐡋	l dmydty ʿl	"...for creation(s) upon..." (Ir. dāmdād-) may be a personal name akin to Devadatta
Sirkap Aramaic inscription 4th century BC (text)	3	𐡍𐡂𐡓𐡅𐡕𐡀 𐡏𐡋	ngrwtʾ ʿl	"...the non-injury upon..." (Ir. na + gada)
Sirkap Aramaic inscription 4th century BC (text)	4	𐡀𐡓𐡆𐡅𐡔 𐡍𐡂𐡓𐡅𐡕𐡀	ʾrzwš ngrwtʾ	cf. Iranian *drzuš "true, right" + "...the non-injury..."
Sirkap Aramaic inscription 4th century BC (text)	5	𐡅 𐡋𐡀𐡁𐡅𐡄𐡉 𐡄𐡅𐡅	w lʾbwhy hww	"...and to his father..."
Sirkap Aramaic inscription 4th century BC (text)	6	𐡄𐡅𐡐𐡕𐡉𐡎𐡕𐡉 𐡆𐡍𐡄	hwptysty znh	"...good obedience; this..."
Sirkap Aramaic inscription 4th century BC (text)	7	𐡆𐡊 𐡁𐡄𐡅𐡅𐡓𐡃𐡄	zk bhwwrdh	"...that..." + cf. Ind. bahuvardha or Ir. vohuvərəd- "good increase"
Sirkap Aramaic inscription 4th century BC (text)	8	𐡄𐡅𐡍𐡔𐡕𐡅𐡍 𐡆𐡉 𐡄𐡅𐡕	hw nštwn zy hwt	Aram. "this" or Ir. "good" + nštwn "document" + "...which is..."
Sirkap Aramaic inscription 4th century BC (text)	9	𐡌𐡓𐡀𐡍 𐡐𐡓𐡉𐡃𐡓	mrʾn Prydr	"...our lord Priyadasi..."
Sirkap Aramaic inscription 4th century BC (text)	10	𐡄𐡋𐡊𐡅𐡕𐡓	hlkwtr hlkwtd	"...going..."
Sirkap Aramaic inscription 4th century BC (text)	11	𐡅𐡀𐡐 𐡁𐡍𐡅𐡄𐡉	wʾp bnwhy	"...and also his son(s)..."
Sirkap Aramaic inscription 4th century BC (text)	12	𐡋𐡌𐡓𐡀𐡍 𐡐𐡓𐡉𐡃𐡓	lmrʾn Prydr	"...of our lord Priyadasi..."

The Soviet linguist Mikhail Bogoljubov treats the original Aramaic text differently, and reconstructs the content of this inscription by comparing it with parts of the Major Rock Edict 4 from Mansehra:

Taxila inscription			Major Rock Edict 4 from Mansehra	
Aramaic	Transliteration	Translation	Prakrit	Translation
■■𐡍𐡊𐡎𐡅𐡕■■■■■■■■■■■■	[..]nkswt[...]	[non-]killing of [the animals, non-hurting]	anarabhe praṇana avihisa	non-killing of the animals; non-hurting
𐡋𐡃𐡌𐡉𐡃𐡕𐡉𐡏𐡋■■■■■■■■■■	ldmydty ʿl [... ʾrzwš]	the living beings, for [relatives right]	bhutana ñatina saṃpaṭi	the living beings; for relatives,
𐡍𐡂𐡃𐡅𐡕𐡀𐡏𐡋■■■■■■■■■■■■■	ngdwtʾ ʿl[...]	approach, for [Brahmanas and Sramanas]	pati bamaṇaśramaṇana	courtesy; for Brahmanas and Sramanas,
𐡀𐡓𐡆𐡅𐡔𐡍𐡂𐡃𐡅𐡕𐡀■■■■■■	ʾrzwš ngdwtʾ [lʾmwhy]	right approach, [to mother]	sa[ṃ]paṭi pati mata	courtesy; to mother
𐡅𐡋𐡀𐡁𐡅𐡄𐡉𐡄𐡅𐡐■■■■■■■■■■■■	wlʾbwhy hwp[tysty...]	and father good [obedience, to elders]	pituṣu suśru[ṣa] vudhrana	and father, obedience; to elders,
𐡄𐡅𐡐𐡕𐡉𐡎𐡕𐡉𐡆𐡍𐡄■■■■	hwptysty znh [wʾny]	good obedience. In this [and other]	[su]śruṣa eṣe añ[e] ca	obedience. In this and other
𐡆𐡍𐡁𐡄𐡅𐡅𐡓𐡃𐡄■■■■■	zn bhwwrdh [hlkwt]	many ways [the practice]	bahuvidhe dhrama-	many ways the practice
𐡄𐡅𐡍𐡔𐡕𐡅𐡓𐡆𐡉𐡄𐡅𐡕■■■■■■■■	hwnštwrzy hwt[yr wyhwtr]	of good deeds was pro[moted; and always will promote]	caraṇe vadhrite vadhrayiśati yeva	of dharma was promoted; and always will promote
𐡌𐡓𐡀𐡍𐡐𐡓𐡉𐡃𐡓■■■■■	mrʾn Prydr[š mlkʾ]	our lord Priyada[si the king]	devanapriye priyadraśi raja	the beloved of the gods Priyadasi the king
𐡄𐡋𐡊𐡅𐡕𐡄■■■■■■■■■■■	hlkwt h[wnštwrzy znh]	this practice of good deeds;	dhama[ca]raṇa ima[ṃ]	this practice of dharma;
𐡅𐡀𐡐𐡁𐡍𐡅𐡄𐡉■■■■■■■■■■	wʾp bnwhy [...]	and also the sons, [grandsons, and great-grandsons]	[putra] pi ca ka natare paṇatika	and also the sons, grandsons, and great-grandsons
𐡋𐡌𐡓𐡀𐡍𐡐𐡓𐡉𐡃𐡓■■■■■■■■■■■■	lmrʾn Prydr[š mlkʾ yhwtrwn]	of our lord Priyada[si the king]	de[va]naṃpriyasa priyadraśine rajine	of the beloved of the gods Priyadasi the king
■■■■■■■■■■■■■■■■■	[hlkwt hwnštwrzy znh]	[will always promote this practice of good deeds]	pavaḍhayiśaṃti yo dhramacaraṇa imaṃ	will always promote this practice of dharma

== See also ==
- List of Edicts of Ashoka
