= Ahraura =

Town in Uttar Pradesh, India

- Town
- Location in Uttar Pradesh, India Ahraura (India)
- Coordinates: 25.02°N 83.02°E
- Country: India
- State: Uttar Pradesh
- District: Mirzapur
- Named for: Scenic beauty

Government
  - Body: Chairman-Gulab Maurya
  - District Magistrate (DM): (IAS)

Area
  - Total: 25 km^{2} (9.7 sq mi)
- Elevation: 87 m (285 ft)

Population (2001)
  - Total: 23,142
  - Density: 930/km^{2} (2,400/sq mi)

Language
  - Official: Hindi
  - Additional official: Urdu
- Time zone: UTC+5:30 (IST)
- PIN: 231301
- Telephone code: 05443
- Vehicle registration: UP 63

Ahraura is a town and a municipal board in the Mirzapur district in the Indian state of Uttar Pradesh.

== Geography ==
Ahraura has an average elevation of 87 metres (285 feet).

== Demographics ==
As of the 2001 India census, Ahraura had a population of 23,142. Males constitute 52% of the population and females 48%. Ahraura has an average literacy rate of 52%, lower than the national average of 59.5%; with 63% of the males and 37% of females literate. 18% of the population is under 6 years of age.

== Tourism ==
Ahraura has many places of interest such as the Lakhaniya Dari waterfalls, Chuna Dari and the Bhandari Devi temple. There are sites with Cave paintings that are believed to be prehistoric.

== History ==
According to Ain-i-Akbari, this region was named after the Abhira (Ahir/Yadava) tribe.

== Festivals ==
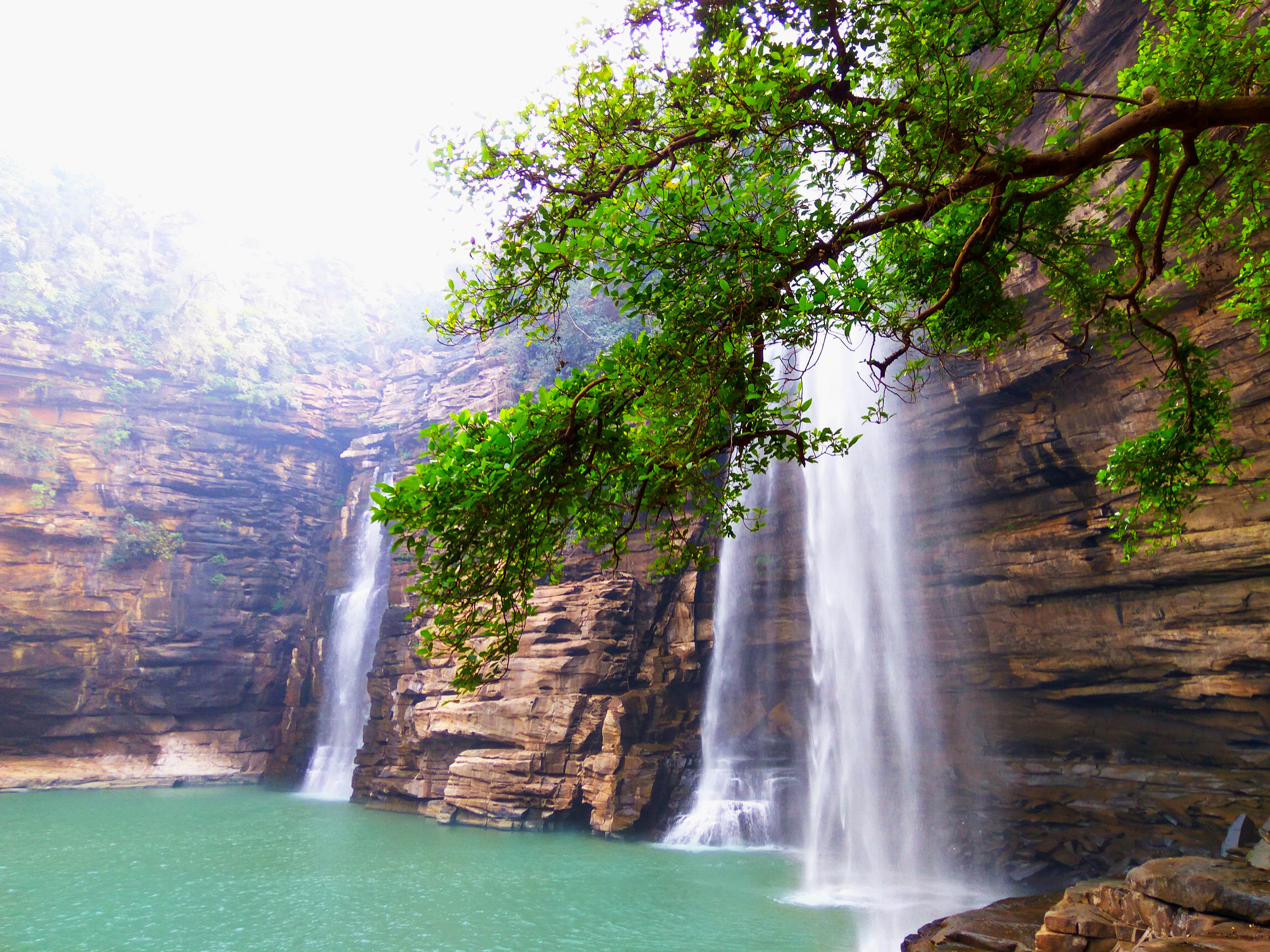
Lakhaniya Dari waterfalls

All major Festivals Like Holi, Deepawali, Eid, Dussehra etc. are celebrated with full zeal and joy. In Months of July, August and September there are many cultural and fun fair are organised at different places in Ahraura.

== Economics ==
Ahraura has been an historical center of trade in the region, lately for forest products such as wooden toys, catechu (also known as kattha or khair, used in Betel nut chewing), Tendu tree leaves (used in preparing smoke-cigars/beedi), Tree raisins, and previously for food grains and vegetables. The nearby forests yield many valued medicinal herbs, a few of which are rare anywhere else.

The city is very famous for the pink stones of its mountain rocks. Geographically the stones found are considered varieties of Chunar stone, but are different in attributes such as being harder. The unique quality of the stone is that it shines pink when touched with water, as in rain, recently used in huge quantity in the national parks erected by the government, in the cities of Lucknow and Noida.

== Notable locations ==
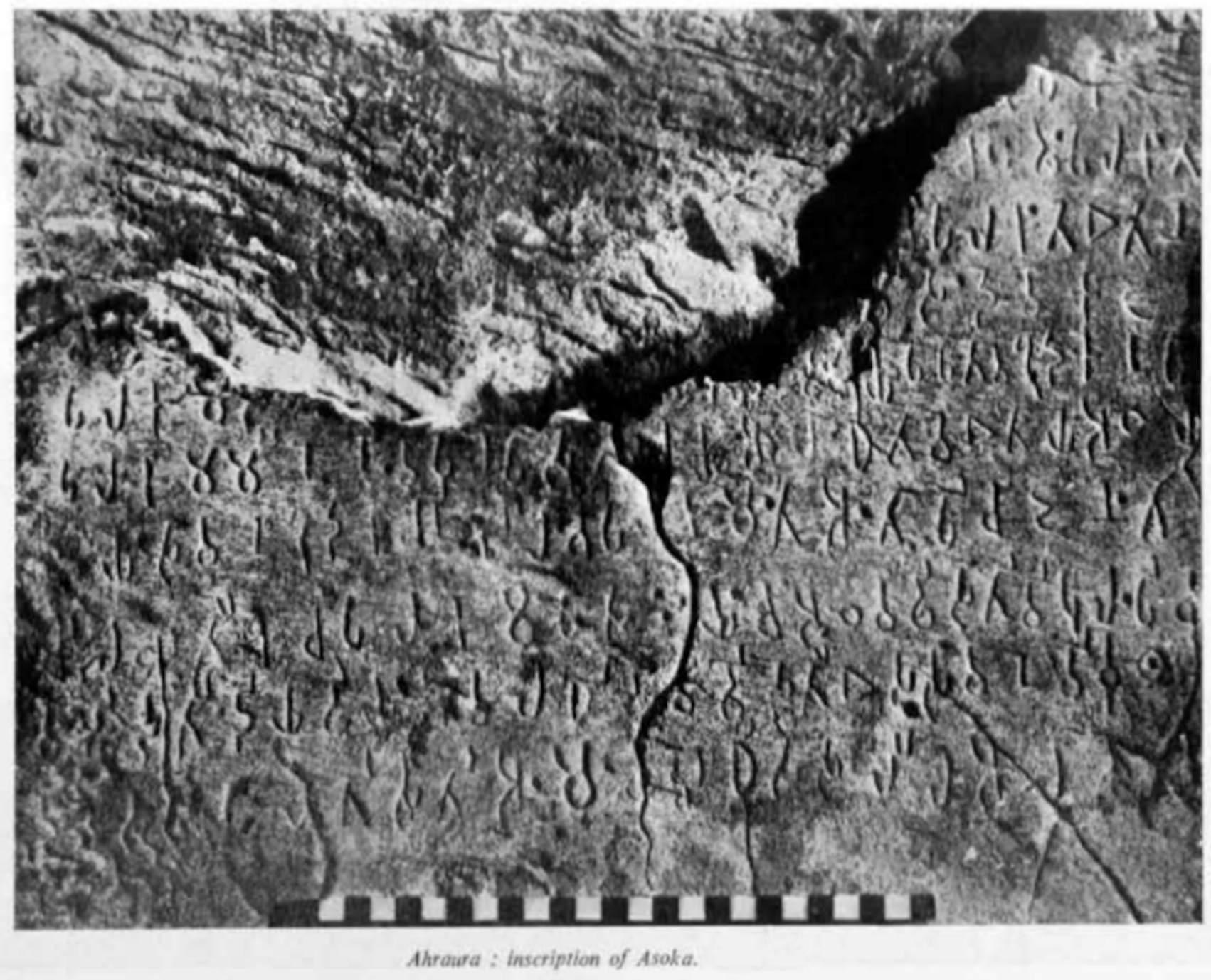
One of the Minor Rock Edicts of Ashoka from Ahraura.

Ahraura has many famous holy places: there is a temple situated in rocky mountain and there is a stone inscription of Ashoka, one of the Minor Rock Edicts of Ashoka. An important monument accounts for the stone-scripture by Emperor Ashoka, in a script possibly Pali, a mark of buddhist influence, which in that period, might have been a site of distribution of food by the monastery, thus contributing the name Bhandari. Near the southern end of the city, near the water reservoir, is a stone pillar, that is also believed to be erected by Emperor Ashoka, with a script/note in Pali, mistaken as a riddle to be solved to reach the hidden wealth of Sumedha (mentioned in Chandrakanta

The city has many famous structures/temples within its boundaries, the two most visited are the Durga Devi temple and the Bhandari Devi temple. The Durga Devi temple is situated at a mountain at the south edge of the city and the Bhandari Devi temple is situated at a mountain at the north edge of the city. The city also has a temple named the Radha Krishna temple in the middle of the city market. There are many architectural structures, scattered in the periphery of the town speaking of its rich history and culture. Ahraura market was one of the oldest markets in eastern Uttar Pradesh.
