= Viratnagar =

Viratnagar Bairat
- town
- Viratnagar
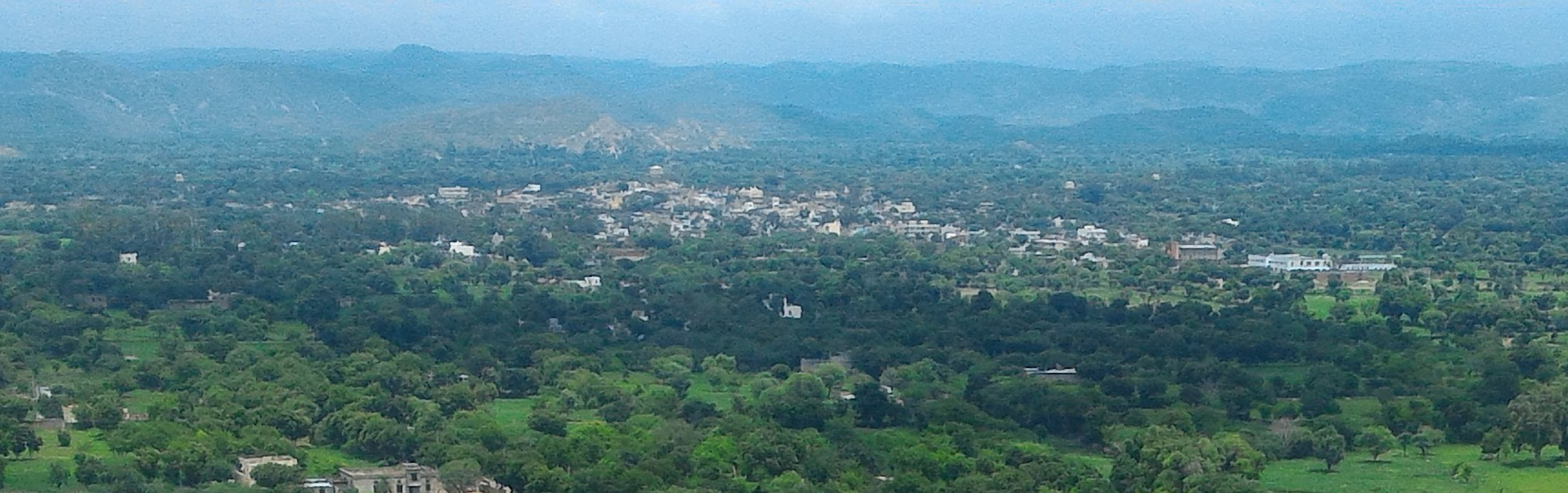
- The city as seen from Bairat Temple

- Location within India Location within Rajasthan
- Coordinates: 27.433189°N 76.181591°E
- Country: India
- State: Rajasthan
- District: Kotputli-Behror
- Elevation: 430 m (1,410 ft)

Population (2001)
  - Total: 17,237

Languages
  - Official: Hindi
- Time zone: UTC+5:30 (IST)
- ISO 3166 code: RJ-IN
- Website: http://www.viratnagar.in

Viratnagar previously known as Bairat (IAST: Bairāṭ) or Bairath (IAST: Bairāṭh) is a town in Kotputli-Behror district of Rajasthan, India.

== History ==
=== Ancient era ===
According to Huen Tsang, visitor from China, Tonk was under Bairath State or Viratnagar previously known as Bairat or Bairath.

The present-day site of Bairat corresponds to the ancient city of Virāṭanagara, which was the capital of the Iron Age Matsya kingdom (c. 1400-c. 350 BC), which was one of the solasa (sixteen) Mahajanapadas (great kingdoms) according to the 6th BCE Buddhist text Anguttara Nikaya. Matsya kingdom had Kuru and Surasena mahajanapadas to its north and east respectively.

=== Medieval era ===
Bairat was a part of the Mauryan Empire. The ruins of the Bijak-ki-pahadi (Bairat Temple), a Buddhist Chaitya (chapel) from the 3rd century BCE located in Bairat, are the oldest free-standing Buddhist structures in India. The town is also home to ruins of a Buddhist monastery, a wood and timber shrine, and two rock-cut edicts (Bairat Edict and Bhabru Edict) from Emperor Ashoka; these date from the Mauryan period (circa 250 BCE). However, Akhnoor, a town in the union territory of Jammu and Kashmir is also considered by many as the ancient Virat Nagar.

=== Early modern era ===
The town has a number of Mughal structures, including a Chhatri (cenotaph) with some of the earliest surviving murals in Rajasthan, and a lodge where the Mughal emperor Akbar hunted and stayed overnight on his yearly pilgrimage to Ajmer.

== Geography ==
Bairat is located at 27.45°N 76.18°E. It has an average elevation of 430 m (1,410 ft).
