= Major Pillar Edicts =

Edicts of the Indian emperor Ashoka

Major Pillar Edicts of Ashoka
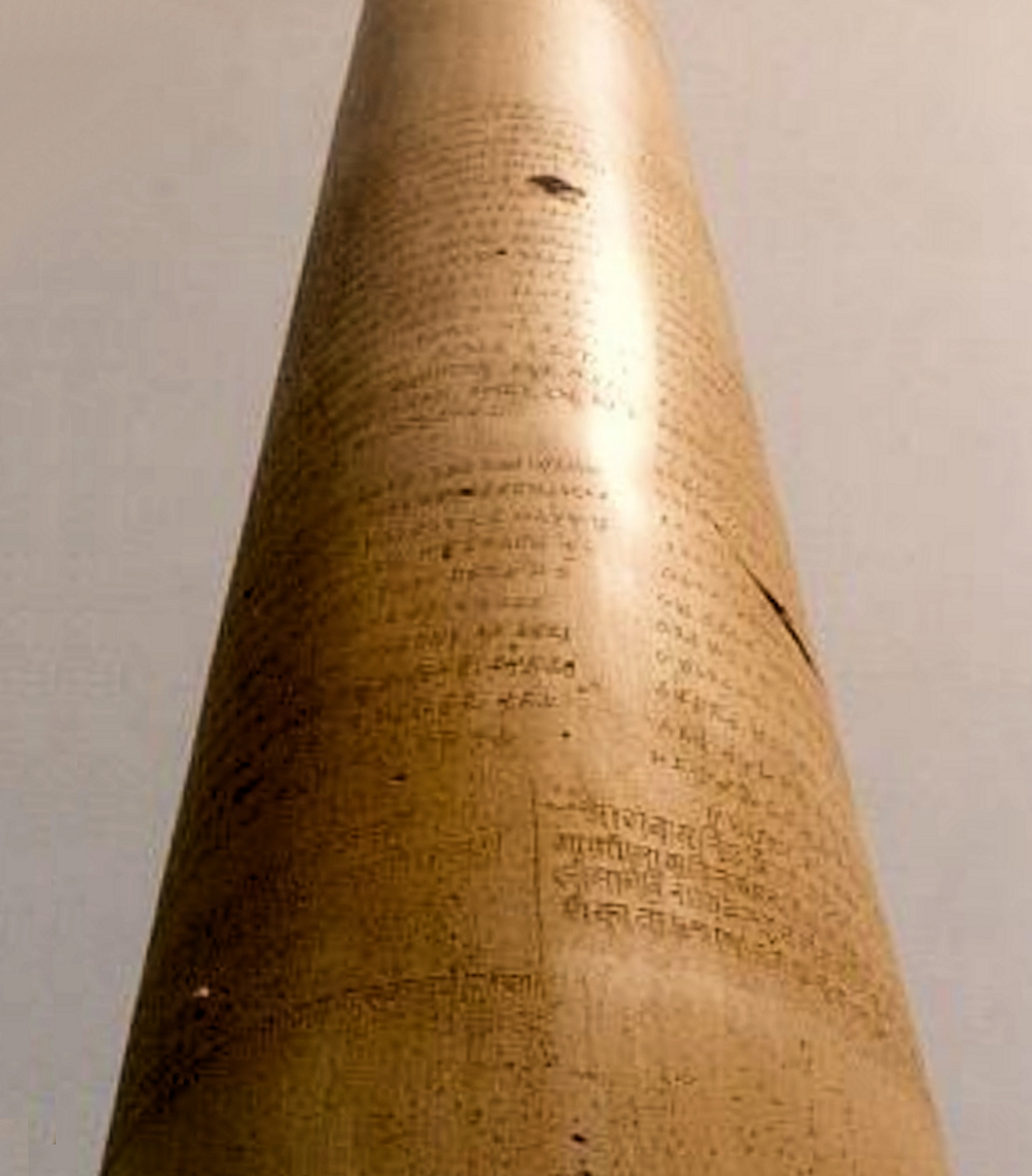
- Major Pillar Edicts on the Delhi-Topra pillar.
- Material: Sandstone
- Created: 3rd century BCE
- Present location: Indian subcontinent, Afghanistan

Location
- Location of the Major Pillar Edicts. New locations after displacement.

The Major Pillar Edicts of Indian Emperor Ashoka refer to 7 separate major Edicts of Ashoka inscribed on columns (the Pillars of Ashoka), which are significantly detailed and are among the earliest dated inscriptions of any Indian monarch. An English translation of the Edicts was published by Romila Thapar.

These edicts are preceded chronologically by the Minor Rock Edicts (11th year of his reign), Major Rock Edicts (12th year of his reign), and Minor pillar edicts (12th year of his reign) and constitute the most technically elegant of the inscriptions made by Ashoka. They were made at the end of the reign of Ashoka (during the 26th and 27th years of his reign), that is, from 237 to 236 BCE. Chronologically they follow the fall of Seleucid power in Central Asia and the related rise of the Parthian Empire and the independent Greco-Bactrian Kingdom c. 250 BCE, and Hellenistic rulers are not mentioned anymore in these last edicts.

Edict No.7, the last Major Pillar Edict, appears exclusively on the Delhi-Topra pillar, and is testamental in nature, making a summary of the accomplishments of Ashoka during his life.

== History ==
Ashoka was the third monarch of the Maurya Empire in the Indian subcontinent, reigning from around 269 BCE. Ashoka famously converted to Buddhism and renounced violence soon after being victorious in a gruesome Kalinga War, yet filled with deep remorse for the bloodshed of the war. Although he was a major historical figure, little definitive information was known as there were few records of his reign until the 19th century when a large number of his edicts, inscribed on rocks and pillars, were found in modern-day India, Nepal, Pakistan and Afghanistan. These many edicts were concerned with practical instructions in running a kingdom such as the design of irrigation systems and descriptions of Ashoka's beliefs in peaceful moral behavior. They contain little personal detail about his life.

== List of the Major Pillar Edicts ==
The Major Pillar Edicts of Ashoka were exclusively inscribed on the Pillars of Ashoka or fragments thereof, at Kausambi (now Allahabad pillar), Topra Kalan, Meerut, Lauriya-Araraj, Lauria Nandangarh, Rampurva (Champaran), and fragments of these in Aramaic (Kandahar, Edict No.7 and Pul-i-Darunteh, Edict No.5 or No.7 in Afghanistan) However many pillars, such as the bull pillar of Rampurva, or the pillar of Vaishali do not have inscriptions.

These pillar edicts include:

Major Pillar Edict I
Asoka's principle of protection of the people

Major Pillar Edict II
Defines dhamma as a minimum of sins, many virtues, compassion, liberality, truthfulness and purity

Major Pillar Edict III
Preach to avoid practices of harshness, cruelty, anger, pride and other sins among the subjects

Major Pillar Edict IV
Prescribe duties and responsibilities of Rajukas, who would go every five years to different parts of empire to spread Dhamma

Major Pillar Edict V
A list of animals and birds which should not be killed on certain days, and another list of animals which have not to be killed at all occasions. Describes the release of 25 prisoners by Ashoka.

Major Pillar Edict VI
Dhamma Policy

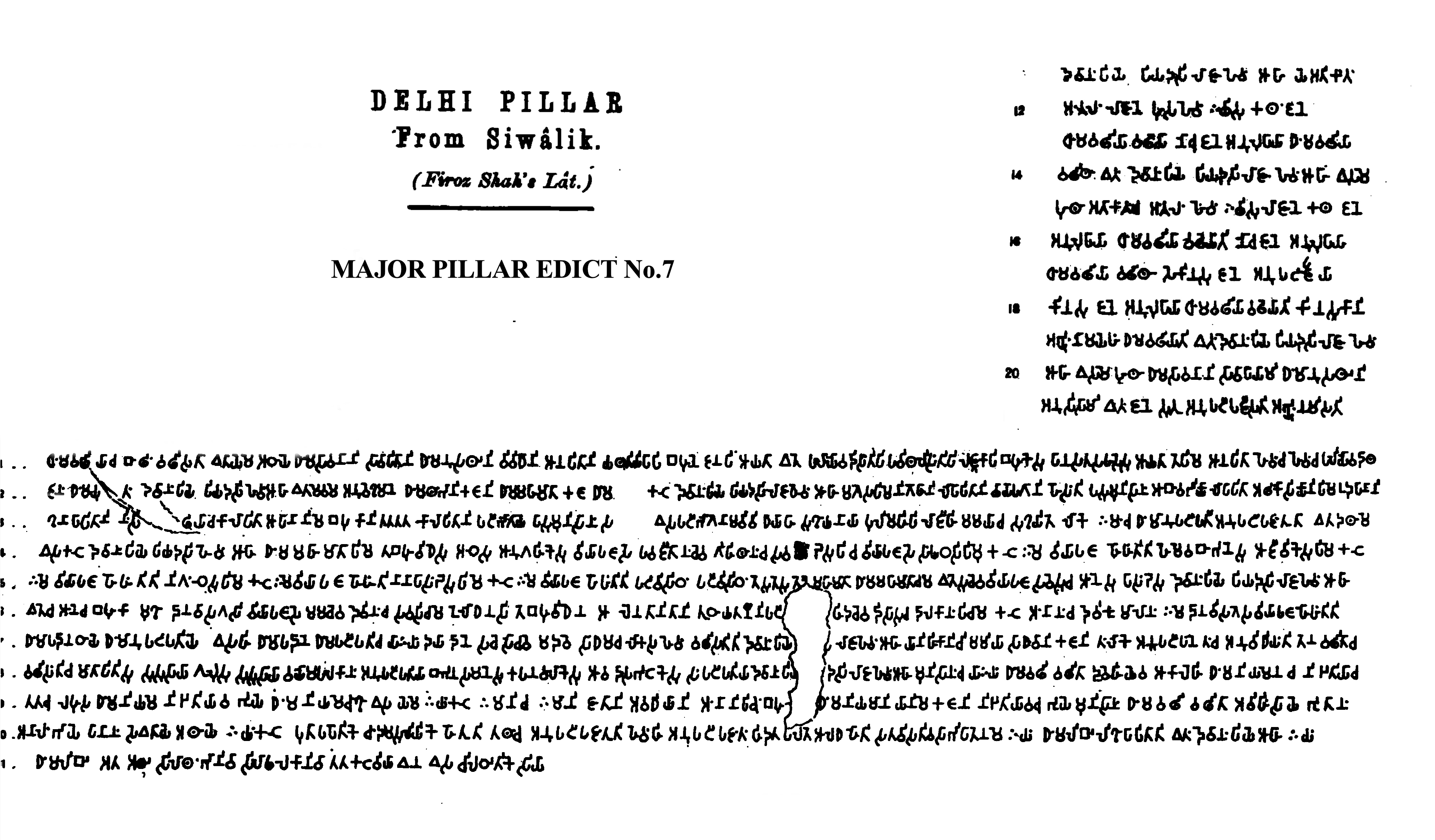
Delhi Topra pillar Major Pillar Edict No.7.

Major Pillar Edict VII
Works done by Asoka for Dhamma Policy. He says that all sects desire both self-control and purity of mind. This edict only appears on the Delhi-Topra pillar.

=== Language of Inscriptions ===
Only one language was used on the pillars: Prakrit in the Brahmi script. A few derived inscriptions were made on rock in Aramaic, in areas of Afghanistan. The edicts are composed in non-standardized and archaic forms Prakrit.

=== Authorship ===
The Major Pillar Edicts are generally attributed to Ashoka. Strictly speaking though, the inscriptions of the Major Pillar Edicts, just as those of the Major Rock Edicts, are not inscribed in the name of "Ashoka", but in the name of "Devanampriya" ("Beloved of the God", thought to be a general regnal title like "Our Lord"), "Devanampriya Priyadasi" ("Our Lord Priyadasi", or literally "Our Lord who glances amicably") or "Devanampriya Priyadasi Raja" ("Our Lord the King Priyadasi"). This title also appears in Greek in the Kandahar Bilingual Rock Inscription, when naming the author of the proclamation as βασιλεὺς Πιοδασσης ("King Piyodasses"), and in Aramaic in the same inscription as "our lord, king Priyadasin".

The association of the Major inscriptions with "Ashoka" is only a reconstruction based on the 3rd-4th century CE Dipavamsa which associates the name "Ashoka" with the name "Priyadarsi", and an extrapolation based on the fact that the name "Ashoka" appears with the title "Devanampriya" ("Beloved of the Gods") in a few of the Minor Rock Edicts. Christopher Beckwith — whose theories are not accepted by mainstream scholarship — has suggested that "Priyadarsi" was a king in his own right, probably the son of Chandragupta Maurya known to the Greeks as Amitrochates, and Ashoka was either a Buddhist legend or a much later king who authored the Buddhist Minor Rock Edicts around the 1st century CE.

Conversely, the Major Pillar Edicts in the name of King Priyadasi do not have a clear Buddhist character, being mainly codes of conduct gathered under the name of "Dharma" (translated as Eusebeia ("Piety") in Greek and "Truth" in Aramaic in the Kandahar Bilingual Rock Inscription), and never mentioning Buddhism, the Buddha or the Samgha (except for Edict no 7 which mentions the Samgha, but the authenticity of which has been doubted by Christopher Beckwith).

However, many of Beckwith's methodologies and interpretations concerning early Buddhism, inscriptions, and archaeological sites have been criticized by other scholars, such as Johannes Bronkhorst and Osmund Bopearachchi. According to Patrick Olivelle, Beckwith's theory is "an outlier and no mainstream Ashokan scholar would subscribe to that view."

== Description of the pillars ==
The Major Pillar Edicts of Ashoka are exclusively inscribed on the Pillars of Ashoka or fragments thereof, although many pillars, such as the bull pillar of Rampurva, or the pillar of Vaishali do not have inscriptions. A few other pillars (the pillars of Sanchi, Sarnath, Rummindei and Nigali Sagar) only have very short inscriptions (the "Schism Edicts", the "Queen's Edict", the "Rummindei Edict" and the "Nigali Sagar Edict"), forming the Minor Pillar Edicts.

The Major Pillar Edicts (excluding the two fragments of translations found in modern Afghanistan) are all located in the Gangetic Plain, in contrast with the Major Rock Edicts, which appear exclusively at the borders of the Maurya Empire.

Major Pillar Edicts of Ashoka
Name	Map	Location	Pillar	Capital/ Close-up	Rubbing
Lauriya-Navandgarh	Main article: Lauria Nandangarh Located in Lauriya-Nandangarh, Bethia, Bihar, India Google map Major Pillar Edicts 1–6. 26.998479°N 84.408476°E	Lauria Nandangarh is located in South Asia			
Allahabad	Main article: Allahabad pillar Allahabad Fort, Allahabad, Uttar Pradesh. Major Pillar Edicts 1–6. Also has one Schism Edict and the "Queen Edict"; Former location in Kosambi: 25.350588°N 81.389549°E; Current location in Allahabad: 25.431111°N 81.87500°E	Allahabad is located in South Asia			
Delhi-Topra	Main article: Delhi-Topra pillar Located in Delhi, originally from Topra in Yamunanagar district, Haryana. Major Pillar Edicts 1–7. Former location in Topra: 30.1252°N 77.1623°E; Current location in New-Delhi: 28.635739°N 77.245398°E	Topra is located in South Asia			
Delhi-Meerut	Main article: Ashokan Edicts in Delhi Located in Delhi, originally from Meerut, Uttar Pradesh. Major Pillar Edicts 1–6. Former location in Meerut: 28.99°N 77.70°E; Current location in Delhi: 28.673853°N 77.211849°E	Meerut is located in South Asia			
Lauriya-Araraj	Main article: Lauriya Araraj Located in Lauriya near Areraj, Bethia, Bihar, India. Major Pillar Edicts 1–6. 26.550227°N 84.647581°E	Lauriya Araraj is located in South Asia			
Rampurva	Main article: Rampurva Located in Rampurva, Bethia, Bihar, India; Major Pillar Edicts 1–6. Another pillar of Rampurva, the bull pillar, does not have inscriptions. 27.2699°N 84.4995°E	Rampurva is located in South Asia			

== Content of the Edicts ==
=== Major Pillar Edict 1 ===
Asoka's principle of protection of the people.

Major Pillar Edict 1
English translation	Prakrit in Brahmi script
King Beloved of the Gods Priyadarsin speaks thus. This rescript on morality was caused to be written by me (when I had been) anointed twenty-six years. (Happiness) in this (world) and in the other (world) is difficult to secure without great love of morality, careful examination, great obedience, great fear (of sin), (and) great energy. But indeed by my instruction this regard for morality and love of morality have been promoted day by day and will progress still (more). And my agents also, both the high ones and the low ones and those of middle rank, are conforming to and practising (morality), (and are thus) able to stir up fickle (persons). In the same way the Mahamatras of the borderers also (are acting). For (their) instruction (is) this, viz. to protect according to morality, to dispose according to morality, to cause pleasure according to morality, (and) to guard (their speech) according to morality. — 1st Major Pillar Edict. Translation by E. Hultzsch (1857-1927). Published in India in 1925. Inscriptions of Asoka p.119-. Public Domain.	

=== Major Pillar Edict 2 ===
Defines dhamma as a minimum of sins, many virtues, compassion, liberality, truthfulness and purity.

Major Pillar Edict 2
English translation	Prakrit in Brahmi script
King Beloved of the Gods Priyadarsin speaks thus. (To practise) morality is meritorious; but what does morality include? (It includes) few sins, many virtuous deeds, compassion, liberality, truthfulness, (and) purity. The gift of spiritual insight also has been bestowed by me in many ways. On bipeds and quadrupeds, on birds and aquatic animals various benefits have been conferred by me, (even) to the boon of life. And many other virtuous deeds also have been performed by me. For the following purpose was this rescript on morality caused to be written by me, (viz.) in order that (men) might conform to it, and that it might be of long duration. And he who will act thus will perform good deeds. — 2nd Major Pillar Edict. Translation by E. Hultzsch (1857-1927). Published in India in 1925. Inscriptions of Asoka p.119-. Public Domain.	

=== Major Pillar Edict 3 ===
Abolishes sins of harshness, cruelty, anger, pride etc.

Major Pillar Edict 3
English translation	Prakrit in Brahmi script
King Beloved of the Gods Priyadarsin speaks thus. (Men) regard only (their) virtuous deeds, (thinking): "This virtuous deed has been performed by me". They do not at all regard (their) evil deeds, (thinking) : "This evil deed has been performed by me". This very (act) is called a sin. Now this is indeed difficult to recognize. But indeed this ought to be regarded thus: these (passions), viz. fierceness, cruelty, anger, pride, envy, are called sinful. Let me not ruin (myself) by (these) very (passions). The following ought to be specially regarded: "This (action conduces) to my (happiness) in this (world), that other (action) to my (happiness) in the other (world). — 3rd Major Pillar Edict. Translation by E. Hultzsch (1857-1927). Published in India in 1925. Inscriptions of Asoka p.119-. Public Domain.	

=== Major Pillar Edict 4 ===
Deals with duties of Rajukas.

Major Pillar Edict 4
English translation	Prakrit in Brahmi script
King Beloved of the Gods Priyadarsin speaks thus. This rescript on morality was caused to be written by me (when I had been) anointed twenty-six years. My Lajukas are occupied with the people, with many hundred thousands of men. I have ordered that either rewards or punishments are left to their discretion, in order that the Lajukas should perform (their) duties confidently (and) fearlessly, that they should bestow welfare and happiness on the people of the country, and that they should confer benefits (on them). They will know how to cause pleasure and to cause pain (to them), and will exhort the people of the country through those who are devoted to morality, in order that they may attain (happiness) both in this (world) and in the other (world). The Lajukas also must obey me. They will also obey the agents who know (my) wishes. And these (agents) will also exhort those (people), in order that the Lajukas may be able to please me. For, as one feels confident after having entrusted (his) child to an intelligent nurse, (thinking): "The intelligent nurse will be able to keep my child well", so the Lajukas were appointed by me for the welfare and happiness of the country-people. In order that they should perform (their) duties, being fearless, confident, (and) unperturbed, for this (purpose) I have ordered that either rewards or punishments are left to the discretion of the Lajukas. For the following is to be desired, (viz,) that there should be both impartiality in judicial proceedings and impartiality in punishments. And my order (reaches) even so far (that) a respite of three days is granted by me to persons lying in prison on whom punishment has been passed, (and) who have been condemned to death. (In this way) either (their) relatives will persuade those [Lajukas) to (grant) their life, or, if there is none who persuades (them), they will bestow gifts or will undergo fasts in order to (attain happiness) in the other (world). For my desire is this, that, even when the time (of respite) has expired, they should attain (happiness) in the other (world). And various moral practices, self-control, (and) the distribution of gifts are (thus) promoted among the people. — 4th Major Pillar Edict. Translation by E. Hultzsch (1857-1927). Published in India in 1925. Inscriptions of Asoka p.119-. Public Domain.	

=== Major Pillar Edict 5 ===
A list of animals and birds which should not be killed on some days, and another list of animals which have not to be killed at all occasions. Describes the release of 25 prisoners by Asoka.

Major Pillar Edict 5
English translation	Prakrit in Brahmi script
King Beloved of the Gods Priyadansin speaks thus. (When I had been) anointed twenty-six years, the following animals were declared by me inviolable, viz. parrots, mainas, the aruna, ruddy geese, wild geese, the nandimukha, the gelata, bats, queen-ants, terrapins, boneless fish, the vedaveyaka, the Ganga-puputaka, skate-fish, tortoises and porcupines, squirrels (?), the srimara, bulls set at liberty, iguanas (?), the rhinoceros, white doves, domestic doves, (and) all the quadrupeds which are neither useful nor edible. Those [she-goats], ewes, and sows (which are) either with young or in milk, are inviolable, and also those (of their) young ones (which are) less than six months old. Cocks must not be caponed. Husks containing living animals must not be burnt. Forests must not be burnt either uselessly or in order to destroy (living beings). Living animals must not be fed with (other) living animals. Fish are inviolable, and must not be sold, on the three Chaturmasis (and) on the Tishya full-moon during three days, (viz.) the fourteenth, the fifteenth, (and) the first (tithit), and invariably on every fast-day. And during these same days also no other classes of animals which are in the elephant-park (and) in the preserves of the fishermen, must be killed. On the eighth (tithi) of (every) fortnight, on the fourteenth, on the fifteenth, on Tishya, on Punarvasu, on the three Chaturmasis, (and) on festivals, bulls must not be castrated, (and) he-goats, rams, boars, and whatever other (animals) are castrated (otherwise), must not be castrated;(then). On Tishya, on Punarvasu, on the Chaturmasis, (and) during the fortnight of (every) Chaturmasis, horses (and) bullocks must not be branded. Until (I had been) anointed twenty-six years, in this period the release of prisoners was ordered by me twenty-five (times). — 5th Major Pillar Edict. Translation by E. Hultzsch (1857-1927). Published in India in 1925. Inscriptions of Asoka p.119-. Public Domain.	

=== Major Pillar Edict 6 ===
Dhamma Policy.

Major Pillar Edict 6
English translation	Prakrit in Brahmi script
King Beloved of the Gods Priyadarsin speaks thus. (When I had been) anointed twelve years, rescripts on morality were caused to be written by me for the welfare and happiness of the people, (in order that), not transgressing those (rescripts), they might attain a promotion of morality in various respects. (Thinking): "Thus the welfare and happiness of the people (will be secured)" I am directing my attention not only to (my) relatives, but to those who are near and far, in order that I may lead-them to happiness, and I am instructing (them) accordingly. In the same manner I am directing my attention to all classes. And all the sects have been honoured by me with honours of various kinds. But this is considered by me (my) principal (duty), viz. visiting (the people) personally. (When I had been) anointed twenty-six years, this rescript on morality was caused to be written by me. — 6th Major Pillar Edict. Translation by E. Hultzsch (1857-1927). Published in India in 1925. Inscriptions of Asoka p.128-130. Public Domain.	

=== Major Pillar Edict 7 ===
Works done by Asoka for Dhamma Policy. He says that all sects desire both self-control and purity of mind. This edict only appears on the Delhi-Topra pillar, at the fortress of Feroz Shah Kotla in New Delhi.

Major Pillar Edict 7
English translation	Prakrit in Brahmi script
King Beloved of the Gods Priyadarsin speaks thus. The kings who were in times past, had this desire, that men might (be made to) progress by the promotion of morality; but men were not made to progress by an adequate promotion of morality. Concerning this, King Beloved of the Gods Priyadarsin speaks thus. The following occurred to me. On one hand, in times past kings had this desire, that men might (be made to) progress by an adequate promotion of morality; (but) on the other hand, men were not made to progress by an adequate promotion of morality. How then might men (be made to) conform to (morality)? How might men (be made to) progress by an adequate promotion of morality? How could I elevate them by the promotion of morality? Concerning this, King Beloved of the Gods Priyadarsin speaks thus. The following occurred to me. I shall issue proclamations on morality, (and) shall order instruction in morality (to be given). Hearing this, men will conform to (it), will be elevated, and will (be made to) progress considerably by the promotion of morality. For this purpose proclamations on morality were issued by me, (and) manifold instruction in morality was ordered (to be given), [in order that those agents] (of mine) too, who are occupied with many people, will exhort (them) and will explain (morality to them) in detail. The Lajukas also, who are occupied with many hundred thousands of men, —these too were ordered by me: "In such and such a manner exhort ye the people who are devoted to morality". Beloved of the Gods Priyadarsin speaks thus. Having in view this very (matter), I have set up pillars of morality (Dhaṃma taṃbhāni, ie "pillars of the Dharma"), appointed Mahamatras of morality (Dhaṃma Mahāmātā, the "Inspectors of the Dharma"), (and) issued [proclamations] on morality. King Beloved of the Gods Priyadarsin speaks thus. On the roads banyan-trees were caused to be planted by me, (in order that) they might afford shade to cattle and men, (and) mango-groves were caused to be planted. And (at intervals) of eight kos wells were caused to be dug by me, and flights of steps (for descending into the water) were caused to be built. Numerous drinking-places were caused to be established by me, here and there, for the enjoyment of cattle and men. [But] this so-called enjoyment (is) [of little consequence]. For with various comforts have the people been blessed both by former kings and by myself. But by me this has been done for the following purpose: that they might conform to that practice of morality. Beloved of the Gods Priyadarsin speaks thus. Those my Mahamatras of morality too are occupied with affairs of many kinds which are beneficial to ascetics as well as to householders, and they are occupied also with all sects. Some (Mahamatras) were ordered by me to busy themselves with the affairs of the Sangha; likewise others were ordered by me to busy themselves also with the Brahmanas (and) Ajivikas; others were ordered by me to busy themselves also with the Nirgranthas; others were ordered by me to busy themselves also with various (other) sects; (thus) different Mahamatras (are busying themselves) specially with different (congregations). But my Mahamatras of morality are occupied with these (congregations) as well as with all other sects. King Beloved of the Gods Priyadarsin speaks thus. Both these and many other chief (officers) are occupied with the delivery of the gifts of myself as well as of the queens, and among my whole harem [they are reporting] in divers ways different worthy recipients of charity both here and in the provinces. And others were ordered by me to busy themselves also with the delivery of the gifts of (my) sons and of other queens' sons, in order (to promote) noble deeds of morality (and) the practice of morality. For noble deeds of morality and the practice of morality (consist in) this, that (morality), viz. compassion, liberality, truthfulness, purity, gentleness, and goodness, will thus be promoted among men. King Beloved of the Gods Priyadarsin speaks thus. Whatsoever good deeds have been performed by me, those the people have imitated, and to those they are conforming. Thereby they have been made to progress and will (be made to) progress in obedience to mother and father, in obedience to elders, in courtesy to the aged, in courtesy to Brahmanas and Sramanas, to the poor and distressed, (and) even to slaves and servants. King Beloved of the Gods Priyadarsin speaks thus. Now this progress of morality among men has been promoted (by me) only in two ways, (viz.) by moral restrictions and by conversion. But among these (two), those moral restrictions are of little consequence; by conversion, however, (morality is promoted) more considerably. Now moral restrictions indeed are these, that I have ordered this, (that) certain animals are inviolable. But there are also many other moral restrictions which have been imposed by me. By conversion, however, the progress of morality among men has been promoted more considerably, (because it leads) to abstention from hurting living beings (and) to abstention from killing animals. Now for the following purpose has this been ordered, that it may last as long as (my) sons and great-grandsons (shall reign and) as long as the moon and the sun (shall shine), and in order that (men) may conform to it. For if one conforms to this, (happiness) in this (world) and in the other (world) will be attained. This rescript on morality was caused to be written by me (when I had been) anointed twenty-seven years. Concerning this, Beloved of the Gods says. This rescript on morality must be engraved there, where either stone pillars or stone slabs are (available), in order that this may be of long duration. — 7th Major Pillar Edict. Translation by E. Hultzsch (1857-1927). Published in India in 1925. Inscriptions of Asoka p.119-. Public Domain.	Photograph of the righthand portion of the 7th Edict. Delhi-Topra pillar Ashoka inscriptions, with 7th edit highlighted Ashoka called his pillars Dhaṃma thaṃbhā (Dharma stambha), i.e. "pillars of the Dharma". 7th Major Pillar Edict. Brahmi script. The expression Dhaṃma Mahāmātā, the "Inspectors of the Dharma", established by Ashoka. 7th Major Pillar Edict on the Delhi-Topra pillar, Brahmi script. Expression "Dhamma Libi" ("Dharma Inscriptions").

==== 7th Edict: issues of authenticity ====
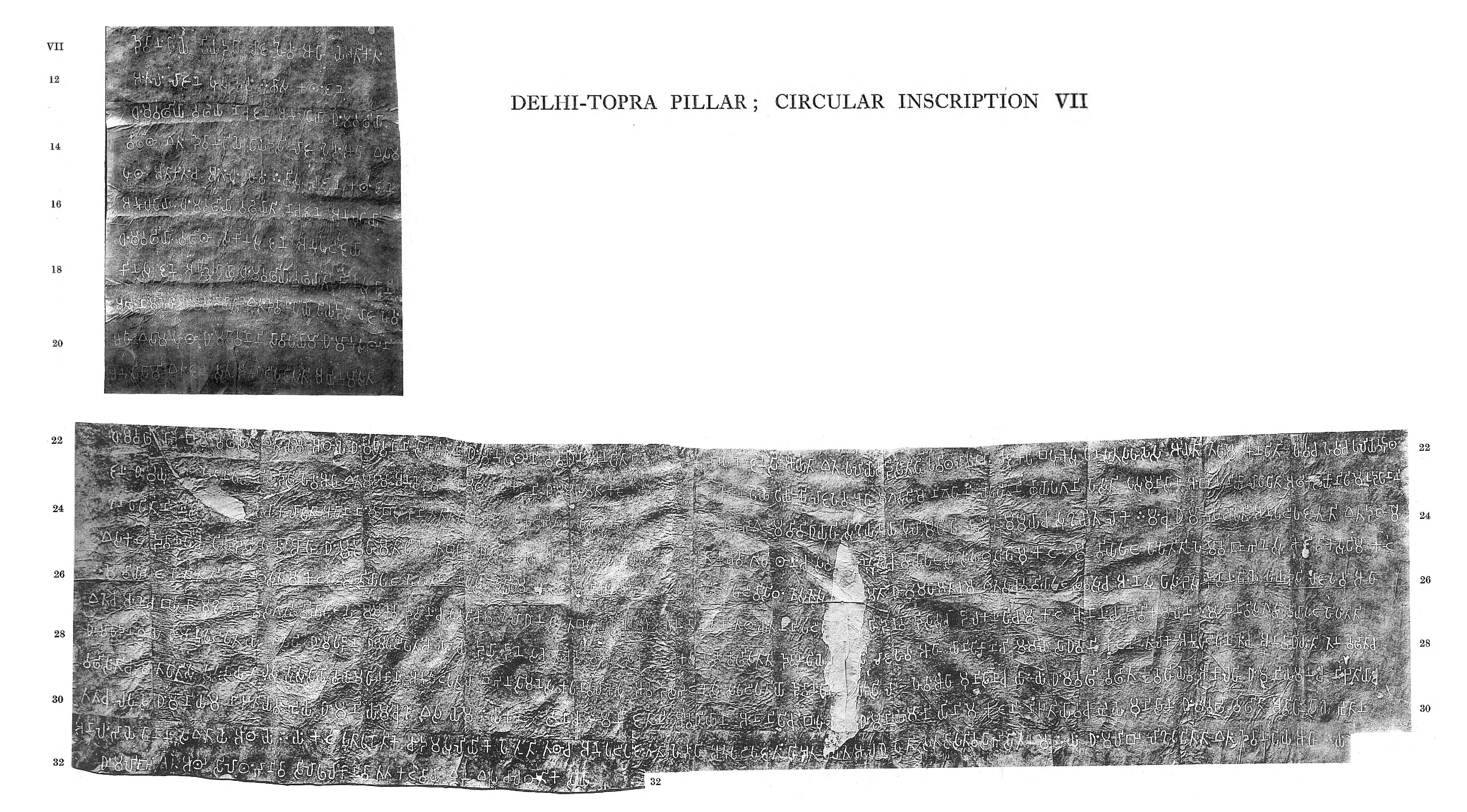
Complete rubbing of the 7th Edict.

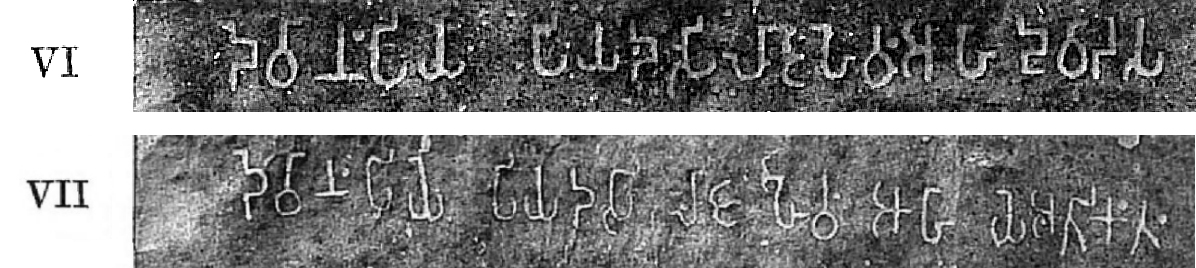
Paleographical differences between the 6th Edict and the 7th Edict (first line of each inscription as a sample): the lettering of the 7th Edict is quite irregular, lightly inscribed (even "scribbled") and different in shape. Only one year is supposed to separate the two (Regnal Year 26, and Regnal year 27). Delhi-Topra pillar.

The authenticity of the 7th Edict is generally not disputed, but Christopher Beckwith — whose theories are not accepted by mainstream scholarship — has challenged it, and he suggests it is a later inscription, possibly made as late as the 5th century CE, when the old Brahmi script had not yet evolved much, and was still readable for any literate person. He gives numerous reasons for his doubts:

- This 7th edict is unique to the Ashoka pillar of Feroz Shah Kotla, New Delhi, and unseen anywhere else, in direct contrast with the other six pillar edicts, which are inscribed on numerous pillars.
- This edict appears to be a compilation, a "hodgepodge", of parts of the other pillar edicts and also parts of the Major Rock Edicts.
- The script and layout of the text (forming the end of a column, continued by a band around the pillar rather than the normal text in columns only) is of a much lower quality than the other edicts, although it is supposed to have been written only one year after the 6th Edict, in the year 27. The lettering is also quite irregular, lightly inscribed (even "scribbled") and different in shape.
- This edict claims the existence of several religious organizations: the Buddhist Samgha (a comparatively late term, whether the ancient term Sramanas is used in other inscriptions such as the Major Rock Edicts, and neither terms are even used in the other Major Pillar Edicts themselves), the Brahmanas (never mentioned in the other Major Pillar Edicts), and, uniquely among all the edicts of Ashoka, the Ajivikas and Nirgranthas (Jains). This may be an attempt by some faiths, especially the Ajivikas and Nirgranthas, to claim Mauryan antiquity, possibly during the time of the Kushan Empire (2-3rd century CE).
- The edict contains many repetitions, consistent with assembling multiple copies of existing inscriptions. Most strangely, the opening royal statement "King Priyadarsin, Beloved of the Gods, says..." is repeated nine times in the 7th Edict, whereas it only appears once at the beginning of all the other known edicts.

However, Beckwith's theories are not accepted by mainstream scholarship: many of his methodologies and interpretations concerning early Buddhism, inscriptions, and archaeological sites have been criticized by other scholars, such as Johannes Bronkhorst and Osmund Bopearachchi. According to Patrick Olivelle, Beckwith's theory is "an outlier and no mainstream Ashokan scholar would subscribe to that view."

== Possible derived inscriptions in Aramaic ==
There are several inscriptions in Aramaic, which seem to be translations or interpretations of passages of the Major Pillar Edicts in the Aramaic language. They were not written on pillars, but on stone blocks. The extent of their similarity with the Major Pillar Edicts is disputed.

Derived inscriptions in Aramaic
Name	Map	Location	Overview	Capital/ Close-up	Rubbing
Kandahar Aramaic inscription	Found in Old Kandahar, Afghanistan (31.602222°N 65.658889°E); Fragment of Major Pillar Edicts 7 in Aramaic.	Kandahar is located in South Asia			
Pul-i-Darunteh Aramaic inscription	Found in Pul-i-Darunteh, Laghman Province, Afghanistan (34.5846°N 70.1834°E); Fragment of Major Pillar Edicts 5 or 7 in Aramaic.	Pul-i-Darunteh is located in South Asia			

== See also ==
- Related topics
  - Ancient iron production
  - Dhar iron pillar
  - History of metallurgy in South Asia
  - Iron pillar of Delhi
  - List of Edicts of Ashoka
  - Pillars of Ashoka
  - Stambha
- Other similar topics
  - Early Indian epigraphy
  - Hindu temple architecture
  - History of India
  - Indian copper plate inscriptions
  - Indian rock-cut architecture
  - List of rock-cut temples in India
  - Outline of ancient India
  - South Indian Inscriptions
  - Tagundaing
