= Kandahar Aramaic inscription =

Archeological discovery in Afghanistan

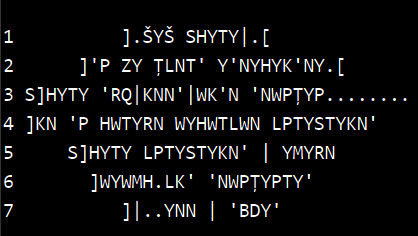
- Transliteration in Roman alphabet of the Aramaic inscription of Kandahar.
- Material: Natural stone.
- Writing: Aramaic
- Created: circa 260 BCE
- Period/culture: 3rd Century BCE
- Discovered: 31.5493°N 65.7175°E
- Place: Kandahar, Afghanistan
- Present location: Kandahar, Afghanistan

Location of the Kandahar Aramaic inscription in Afghanistan.

The Aramaic inscription of Kandahar is an inscription on a fragment of a block of limestone (24x18 cm) discovered in the ruins of Old Kandahar, Afghanistan in 1963, and published in 1966 by André Dupont-Sommer. It was discovered practically at the same time as the Greek Edicts of Ashoka, which suggests that the two inscriptions were more or less conjoined. The inscription was written in Aramaic, probably by the Indian emperor Ashoka about 260 BCE. Since Aramaic was the official language of the Achaemenid Empire, which disappeared in 320 BCE with the conquests of Alexander the Great, it seems that this inscription was addressed directly to the populations of this ancient empire for whom Aramaic remained the language of use.

== Background ==
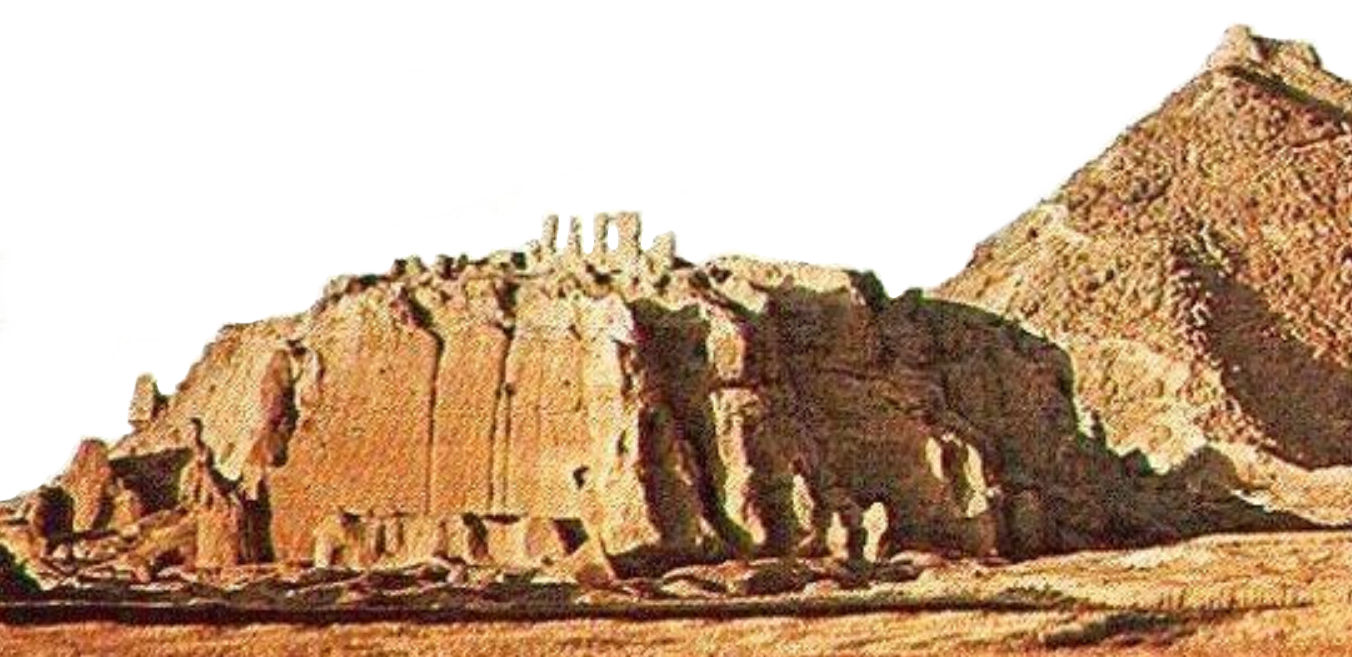
The inscription was discovered in the remains of the old city of Kandahar (probably the ancient Alexandria of Arachosia).

The discovery of this inscription is to be related to that of several other inscriptions in Aramaic or Greek (or both sets), written by Asoka. The most famous are the Kandahar Bilingual Inscription, written in Greek and Aramaic, or the Greek Edicts of Ashoka, also found in Kandahar. Previously, in 1915, Sir John Marshall discovered the Aramaic Inscription of Taxila, and in 1932 another inscription in Aramaic was discovered in the Laghman Valley in Pul-i-Darunteh, the Pul-i-Darunteh Aramaic inscription. Finally, another inscription, the Aramaic inscription of Laghman was also discovered in 1970.

The Aramaic inscription of Kandahar is an inscription in "Indo-Aramaic" alternating Indian language and Aramaic language, but using only the Aramaic script, the Aramaic parts translating the Indian parts transcribed in the Aramaic alphabet. It does not explicitly refer to Ashoka in the fragment that was found, but the place of discovery, the style of writing, the vocabulary used, allows to link the inscription to the other Ashoka inscriptions known in the region.

== Content of the inscription ==
This inscription is usually interpreted as a version of a passage from Major Pillar Edict n°7.

The word SHYTY which appears several times corresponds to the Middle Indian word Sahite (Sanskrit Sahitam), meaning "in agreement with", "according to ...", and which allows to introduce a quote, in this case here Indian words found in the Ashoka Edits. Many of these Indian words, transcribed here phonetically in Aramaic, are indeed identifiable, and otherwise exist only in Major Pillar Edict n°7 of Ashoka, in the same order of use : 'NWPTYPTY' corresponds to the Indian word anuppatipatiya (without order, in disorder), and 'NWPTYP ...' to anuppatipamme. Y'NYHYK'NY .... corresponds to yani hi kanici and is the first word of this edict.

There are also several words in the Aramaic language, the role of which would be to explain the meaning of the Indian words and phrases mentioned: the word WK'N "and now", WYHWTRYWN "they have grown, and they will grow", PTYSTY "obedience" ....

This inscription, in spite of its partial and often obscure character, seems to be a translation or a line-by-line commentary of elements of Major Pillar Edict n°7. A more extensive analysis with photographs was published in the Asian Journal.

== See also ==
- List of Ashoka Edicts
- Kandahar Bilingual Rock Inscription
- Asoka - the Buddhist Emperor of India by Vincent Arthur Smith Chapter 4: The Rock Edicts (this version)
