= First Aramaic inscription of Laghman =

Rock inscription by Ashoka

Aramaic inscription of Laghman
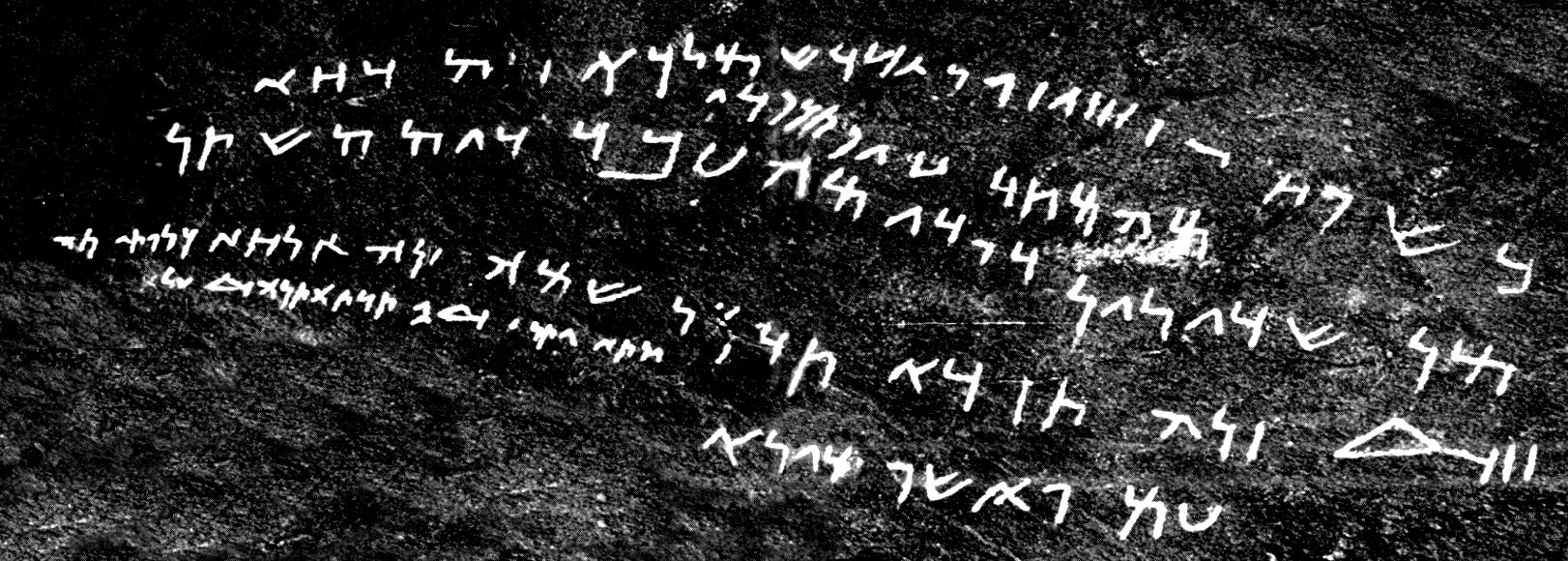
- Aramaic inscription of Laghman
- Material: Natural stone.
- Writing: Aramaic
- Created: c. 260 BCE
- Period/culture: 3rd Century BCE
- Discovered: 34.5846°N 70.1834°E
- Place: Laghman Province, Afghanistan
- Present location: Laghman Province, Afghanistan

Location of the Aramaic inscription of Laghman

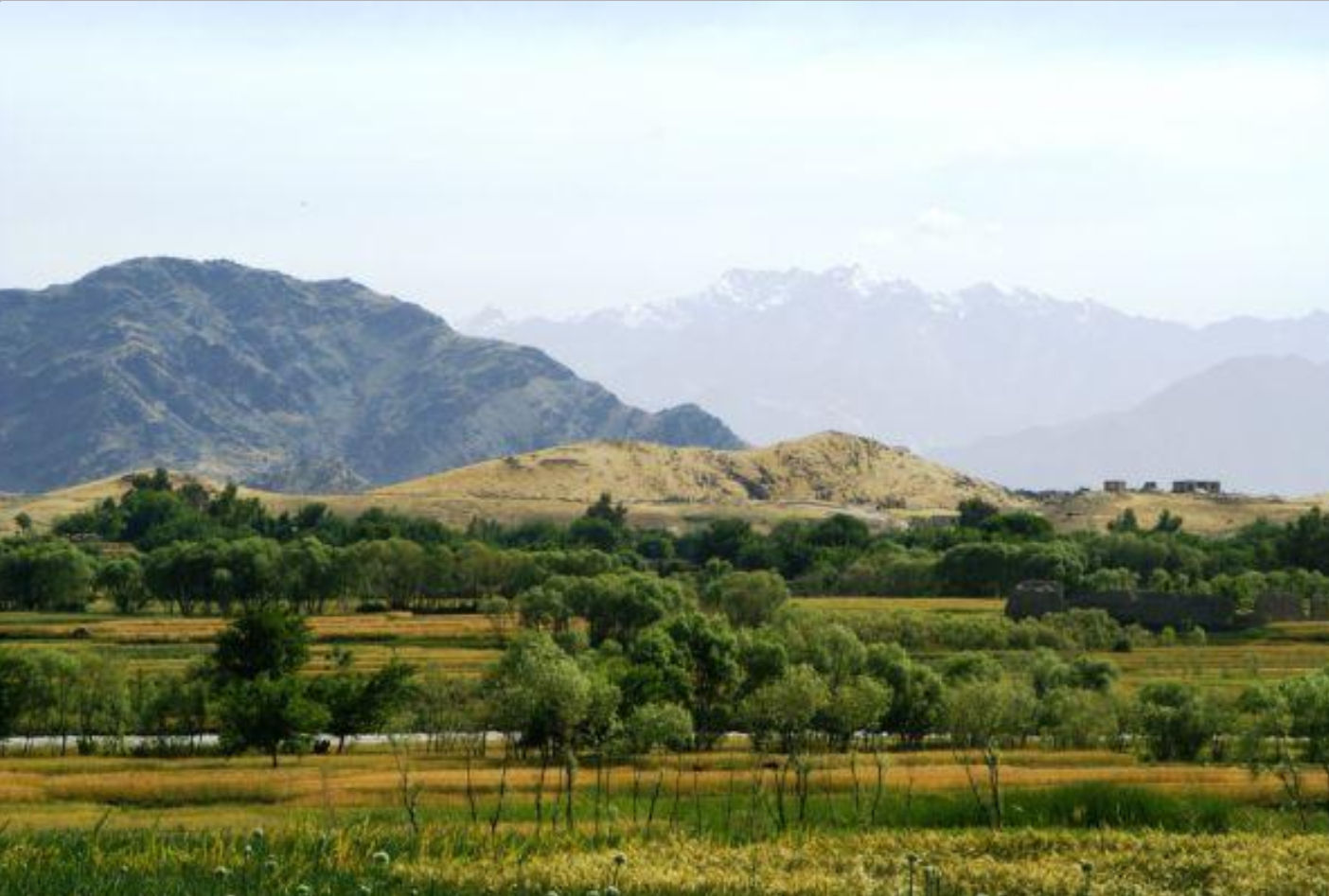
Laghman valley.

The First Aramaic inscription of Laghman, also called the Laghman I inscription to differentiate from the Laghman II inscription discovered later, is an inscription on a slab of natural rock in the area of Laghmân, Afghanistan, written in Aramaic by the Indian emperor Ashoka about 260 BCE, and often categorized as one of the Minor Rock Edicts of Ashoka. This inscription was published in 1970 by André Dupont-Sommer. Since Aramaic was an official language of the Achaemenid Empire, and reverted to being just its vernacular tongue in 320 BCE with the conquests of Alexander the Great, it seems that this inscription was addressed directly to the populations of this ancient empire still present in this area, or to border populations for whom Aramaic remained the language used in everyday life.

== Epigraphical context ==
The chance discovery by two Belgian anthropologists of this inscription in 1969 is one of a set of similar inscriptions in Aramaic or Greek (or both together), written by Asoka. In 1915, Sir John Marshall had discovered the Aramaic Inscription of Taxila, followed in 1932 by the Pul-i-Darunteh Aramaic inscription. In 1958 the famous Bilingual Kandahar Inscription, written in Greek and Aramaic was discovered, and in 1963 the Greek Edicts of Ashoka, again in Kandahar. In the same year 1963 and again in Kandahar, an inscription in "Indo-Aramaic" known as the Kandahar Aramaic inscription or Kandahar II was found, in which the Indian Prakrit language and the Aramaic language alternate, but using only the Aramaic script. The Aramaic parts translate the Indian parts transcribed in the Aramaic alphabet. A few years after this description was discovered, in 1973, the Lahmann II inscription followed.

== The inscription ==
The text of the Aramaic Inscription of Laghman has been transliterated into the Latin alphabet and translated as follows:

Aramaic Inscription of Laghman^{Translation by André Dupont-Sommer}
Line	Original (Aramaic alphabet)	Transliteration	English translation
1	𐡁𐡔𐡍𐡕 𐡛 𐡗 𐡇𐡆𐡉 𐡗 𐡐𐡓𐡉𐡃𐡓𐡔 𐡌𐡋𐡊𐡀 𐡗 𐡓𐡒 𐡃𐡇𐡀	bšnt 10 ∣ ḥzy ∣ Prydrš mlkʾ ∣ rq dḥʾ	In the year 10, behold, the king Priyadasi expelled vanity from among prosperous men,
2	𐡌𐡄 𐡌𐡑𐡃 𐡁𐡓𐡉𐡅𐡕 𐡊𐡅𐡓𐡉	mh mṣd brywt kwry	friends of that which is vain,
3	𐡌𐡍 𐡔𐡓𐡉𐡓𐡉𐡍 𐡃𐡅𐡃𐡉 𐡌𐡄 𐡏𐡁𐡃 𐡓𐡉𐡒 𐡒𐡔𐡕𐡍	mn šryryn dwdy mh ʿbd ryq qštn	friends of those who fish fish-creatures.
4	𐡙 𐡝 𐡆𐡍𐡄 𐡕𐡌𐡄 𐡕𐡃𐡌𐡓 𐡔𐡌𐡄 𐡆𐡍𐡄 𐡀𐡓𐡄𐡀 𐡊𐡍𐡐𐡕𐡉 𐡎𐡄𐡕𐡉	200 znh rmh Tdmr šmh znh ʾrʾ knpty shty	At 200 "bows", there is over there the place called Tadmor. This is the KNPTY road, that is to say (the road) of the Garden:
5	𐡂𐡍𐡕𐡀 𐡉𐡕𐡓𐡉 𐡝 𐡜 𐡕𐡓𐡕𐡀 𐡕𐡍𐡄 𐡝 𐡏𐡋𐡀 𐡜 𐡜 𐡜 𐡜	gntʾ ytry 100 20 trtʾ tnh 100 ʿlʾ 20 20 20 20	more than 120 ("bow"). At TRT', here: 100. Above: 80.
6	𐡏𐡌 𐡅𐡀𐡔𐡅 𐡃𐡉𐡍𐡀	ʿm Wʾšw dynʾ	Done with Wasu the judge

== Interpretations ==
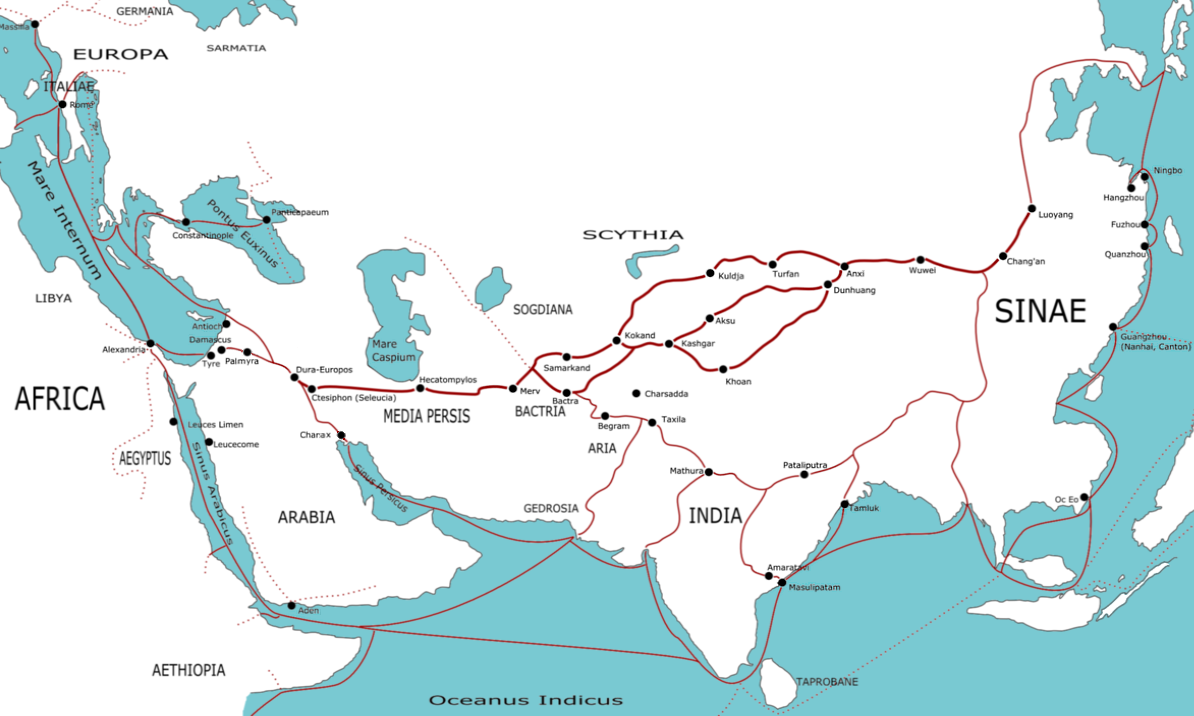
The Laghman Valley was a compulsory stop on the main trade route from India to Palmyra.

The translation is slightly incomplete but brings some valuable indications. It first mentions the propagation of moral rules, which Ashoka will call "Dharma" in his Edicts of Ashoka, consisting of the abandonment of vanity and respect for the life of the people and animals (here, urging people to give up fishing).

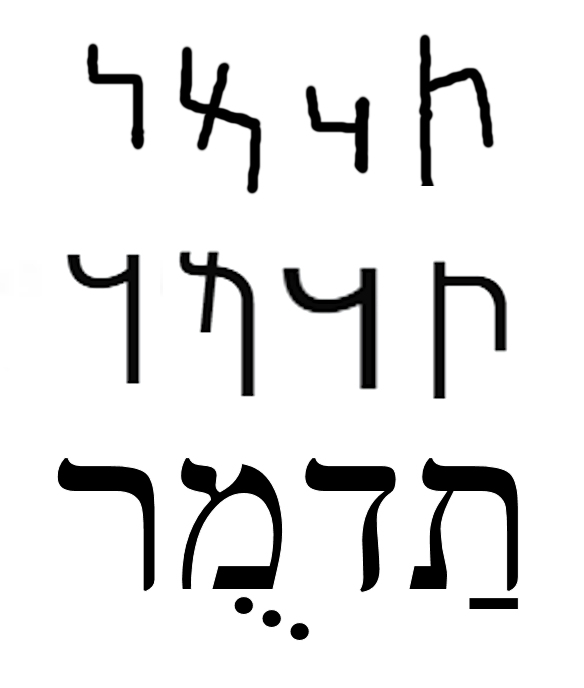
The word "Tadmor" in the Laghman inscription (top, right to left), compared to "Tadmor" in the Imperial Aramaic script (middle), and in the modern Hebrew script (bottom).

Then, according to semitologist André Dupont-Sommer, who made a detailed analysis of the script observed in multiple rock inscriptions in the Laghman valley as well as in other Aramaic inscriptions of Ashoka, the inscription mentions the city of Tadmor (Tdmr in the Aramaic script in the inscription, ie Palmyra), the destination of the great commercial road leading from India to the Mediterranean basin, located at a distance of 3,800 kilometres (2,400 mi). According to the reading of Dupont-Sommer, Palmyra is separated by two hundred "bows" from Laghman. In the inscription, the word used to indicate bow is "QŠTN", and Dupont-Sommer asserted that it is an Aramaic word denoting a unit to measure a distance of 15 to 20 kilometres (9.3 to 12.4 mi), which could represent a day on the road for an archer. Other distances are then given, which makes it possible to interpret Laghman's inscription as a kind of information terminal on the main trade route with the West.

Franz Altheim and Ruth Altheim-Stiehl read three hundred instead of two hundred bows; they equated it with the Vedic unit of measurement yojana, c. 12 kilometres (7.5 mi), which would result in a number close to the actual 3,800 kilometres (2,400 mi) distance between Laghman and Palmyra. The linguist Helmut Humbach criticized the reading of Dupont-Sommer and considered his claims regarding the distance to have no validation.

Another issue is that in the Aramaic alphabet, the letters "r" and "d" share an identical character. Jean de Menasce read the city's name "Trmd" and identified it with Termez on the Oxus river. Linguist Franz Rosenthal also contested the reading of Dupont-Sommer and considered that the inscription refers to an estate called "Trmr". Historian Bratindra Nath Mukherjee rejected the readings of both Dupont-Sommer and de Menasce; he contested the large value attributed to "bow", considering it a small unit. The historian also rejected the reading of Tdmr and Trmd as referring to a city; in the view of Mukherjee, the name, whether Tdmr or Trmd refers to the rock on which the inscription was carved itself.

The Aramaic Inscription of Laghman is the oldest of the known Ashoka inscriptions, with the Kandahar Bilingual Inscription, both dated to the year 10 of Ashoka's reign.

Another Aramaic inscription, the Laghman II inscription, almost identical, was discovered nearby in the Laghman Valley, and published in 1974.

== See also ==
- List of the Edicts of Ashoka
- Kandahar Bilingual Inscription
- Asoka - the Buddhist Emperor of India Chapter 4 by Vincent Arthur Smith: The Rock Edicts (this version)
- The Second Laghman Inscription

== Sources ==
- Kaizer, Ted (2017). "Trajectories of Hellenism at Tadmor-Palmyra and Dura-Europos". In Chrubasik, Boris; King, Daniel (eds.). Hellenism and the Local Communities of the Eastern Mediterranean: 400 BCE-250 CE. Oxford University Press. ISBN 978-0-192-52819-3.
- MacDowall, David w.; Taddei, Maurizio (1978). "The Early Historic Period: Achaemenids and Greeks". In Allchin, Frank Raymond; Hammond, Norman (eds.). The Archaeology of Afghanistan from Earliest Times to the Timurid Period. Academic Press. ISBN 978-0-120-50440-4.
- Mukherjee, Bratindra Nath (2000) [1984]. Studies in Aramaic Edicts of Aśoka (2 ed.). Kolkata: Indian Museum. OCLC 62327000.
- Rosenthal, Franz (1978). "The Second Laghmân Inscription". Eretz-Israel: Archaeological, Historical and Geographical Studies. 14: H.L. Ginsberg Volume. Israel Exploration Society. ISSN 0071-108X.
