= Western Ganga administration =

The Western Ganga administration (350 - 1000 CE) (Kannada: ಪಶ್ಚಿಮ ಗಂಗ ಸಂಸ್ಥಾನ) refers to the administrative structure that existed during the rule of this important dynasty of ancient Karnataka. They are known as Western Gangas to distinguish them from the Eastern Gangas who in later centuries ruled over modern Orissa. The Western Ganga sovereignty lasted from about 350 to 550, initially ruling from Kolar and later moving their capital to Talakad on the banks of the Kaveri River in modern Mysore district. Later they ruled as an important feudatory to the imperial Chalukyas of Badami and the Rashtrakutas of Manyakheta.

== Administration ==
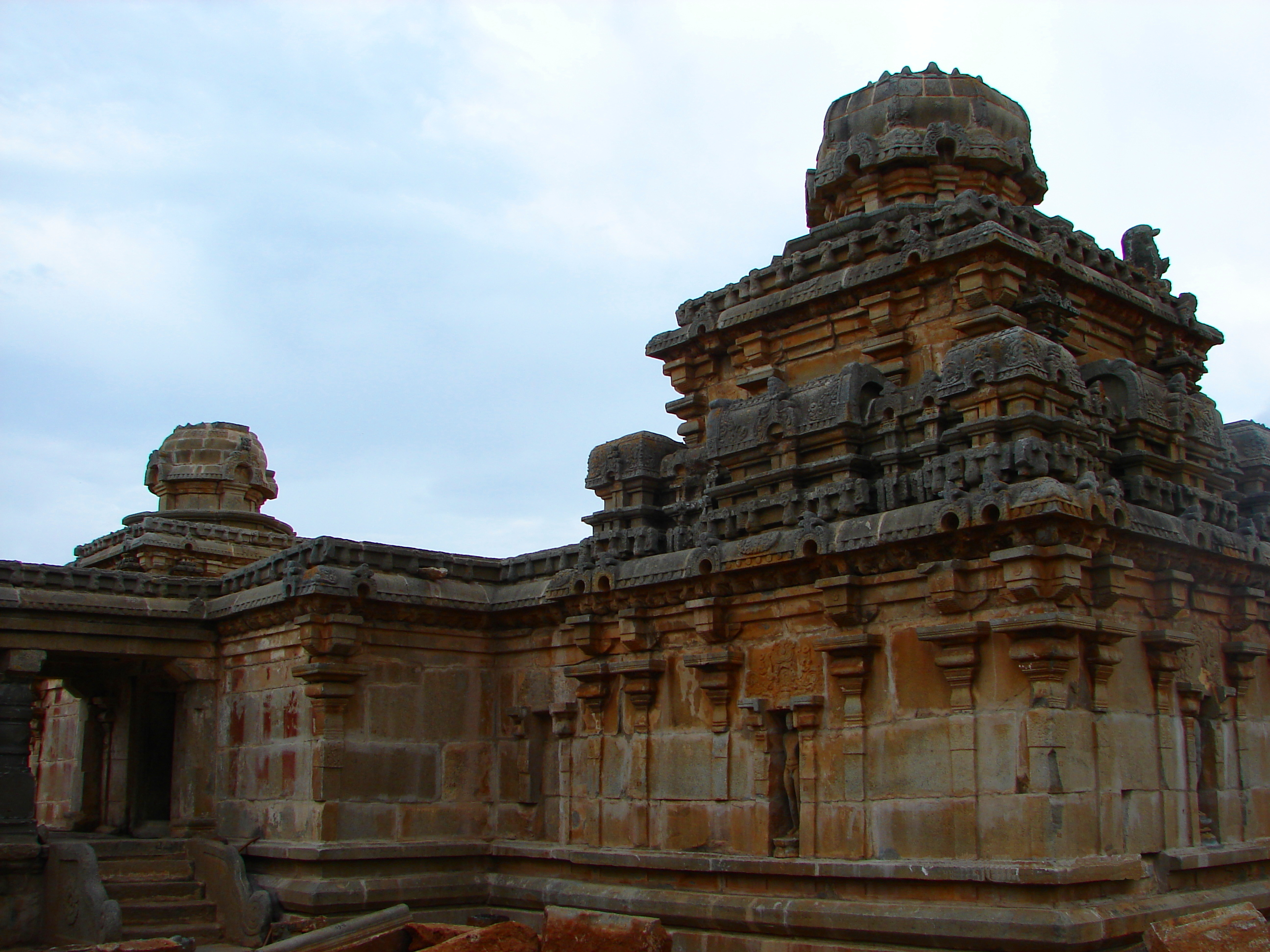
Panchakuta basadi of the 9th century at Kambadahalli

The Western Ganga administration was influenced by some principles in ancient text Arthashastra. Succession to the throne was hereditary though there were instances when it was overlooked. Though a feudatory of larger South Indian empires for most of their long rule, they wielded significant autonomy in local affairs. The kingdom was divided into Rashtra (district) and further into Visaya (possibly 1000 villages) and Desa. From the 8th century the Sanskrit term Visaya was replaced by the Kannada term Nadu, example of which are Sindanadu-8000, Punnadu-6000, with scholars differing about the significance of the numerical suffix. They opine that it was the revenue yield of the division computed in cash terms, denoted the number of fighting men in that division, the number of revenue paying hamlets in that division, and most popularly it may meant the number of villages included in that territory. Further it has been suggested that for large territories such as Gangavadi-96000, the "thousand" suffix may have meant one Nadu and hence Gangavadi-96000 was Gangavadi with 96 Nadus

Inscriptions have revealed several administrative designations such as prime minister (sarvadhikari), treasurer (shribhandari), foreign minister (sandhivirgrahi), chief minister (mahapradhana) all of whom also served as commanders (dandanayaka), royal steward (manevergade), master of robes (mahapasayita), commander of elephant corps (gajasahani), commander of cavalry (thuragasahani), superintendent (antahpuradhyaksha), chief guard (mahapadiyara), betel leaf carrier (hadapada or adepa), royal secretary (rajasutradhari), private secretary (rahasyadhikrita), archivist of records (mahamatra or sasanadore), survey official (rajjuka), accountant (lekhaka). In the royal house, Niyogis oversaw palace administration, royal clothing and jewellery etc.; the Padiyara were responsible for court ceremonies including door keeping and protocol. Officials at the local level were the pergade, nadabova, nalagamiga, prabhu and gavunda.

The pergades were superintendents from all social classes; artisan, goldsmith, blacksmith etc. pergades dealing with the royal household were called manepergade (house superintendent), when they collected tolls they were called Sunka vergades. The nadabovas were accountants and tax collectors at the Nadu level and sometimes functioned as scribes. The nalagamigas were officers who organized and maintained defence at the Nadu level. The prabhu constituted a group of elite drawn together to witness land grants and demarcation of land boundaries.

The gavundas who appear most often in inscriptions were the backbone of medieval polity of the southern Karnataka region. As landlords and local elite, the state utilized their services to collect taxes, maintain records of landownership, bear witness to grants and transactions and even raise militia when required. Owing strong personal allegiance to the king, they were vested with certain rights over villages. It appears the gavundas operated as corporations in the Kaveri valley but as individuals in the northern and eastern domains of the Gangas. They had rights to make grants that may have been occasionally exempt of local taxes. There were two types of gavundas; the ur-gavundas who were lower in status and wielded control at the village level and the nadu-gavunda who oversaw the Nadu and were directly appointed by the king.

Inscriptions that specify land grants, rights and ownership were descriptive of the boundaries of demarcation using natural features such as rivers, streams, water channels, hillocks, large boulders, layout of the village, location of forts (kote) if any in the proximity, irrigation canals, temples, tanks, even shrubs and large trees. Also included was the type of soil, the crops meant to be grown, tanks or wells to be excavated for irrigation. Inscriptions mention wet land, cultivable land, forest and waste land. There are numerous references to hamlets (palli) attesting to the hunter communities that existed (bedapalli).

The size of land granted to the family of a hero who perished in defence of cattle raids was small compared to endowments made to heroes of inter-dynastic battles. These families received large tracts of land, hamlets or even villages in recognition of the sacrifice, the title held by the fallen hero at times passing on to the members of the family. Feudal lords were military commanders who held the title arasa (from the 6th century onwards). These arasas were either Brahmins or from tribal background and controlled hereditary territories paying periodic tribute to the king. The velavali, loyal bodyguards of the royalty were fierce warriors under oath (vele). They moved closely with the royal family and were expected to fight for the master and be willing to lay down their lives in the process. If the king died, the velavali were required to self immolate on the funeral pyre of the master. Thus a close bond existed between the master and the velavali who was referred to as manemaga (son of the house)
