= Pul-i-Darunteh Aramaic inscription =

Inscribed rock in modern-day Afghanistan

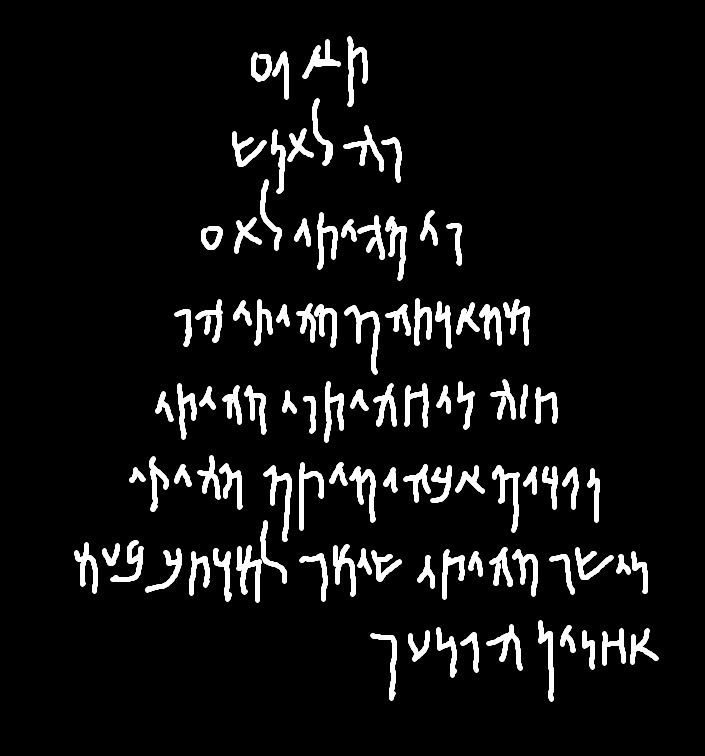
- Pul-i-Darunteh Aramaic inscription
- Material: Natural stone.
- Writing: Aramaic
- Created: circa 260 BCE
- Period/culture: 3rd Century BCE
- Discovered: 1932
- Place: Pul-i-Darunteh, Laghman Province, Afghanistan
- Present location: Pul-i-Darunteh, Laghman Province, Afghanistan

Location of the Aramaic inscription of Pul-i-Darunteh.

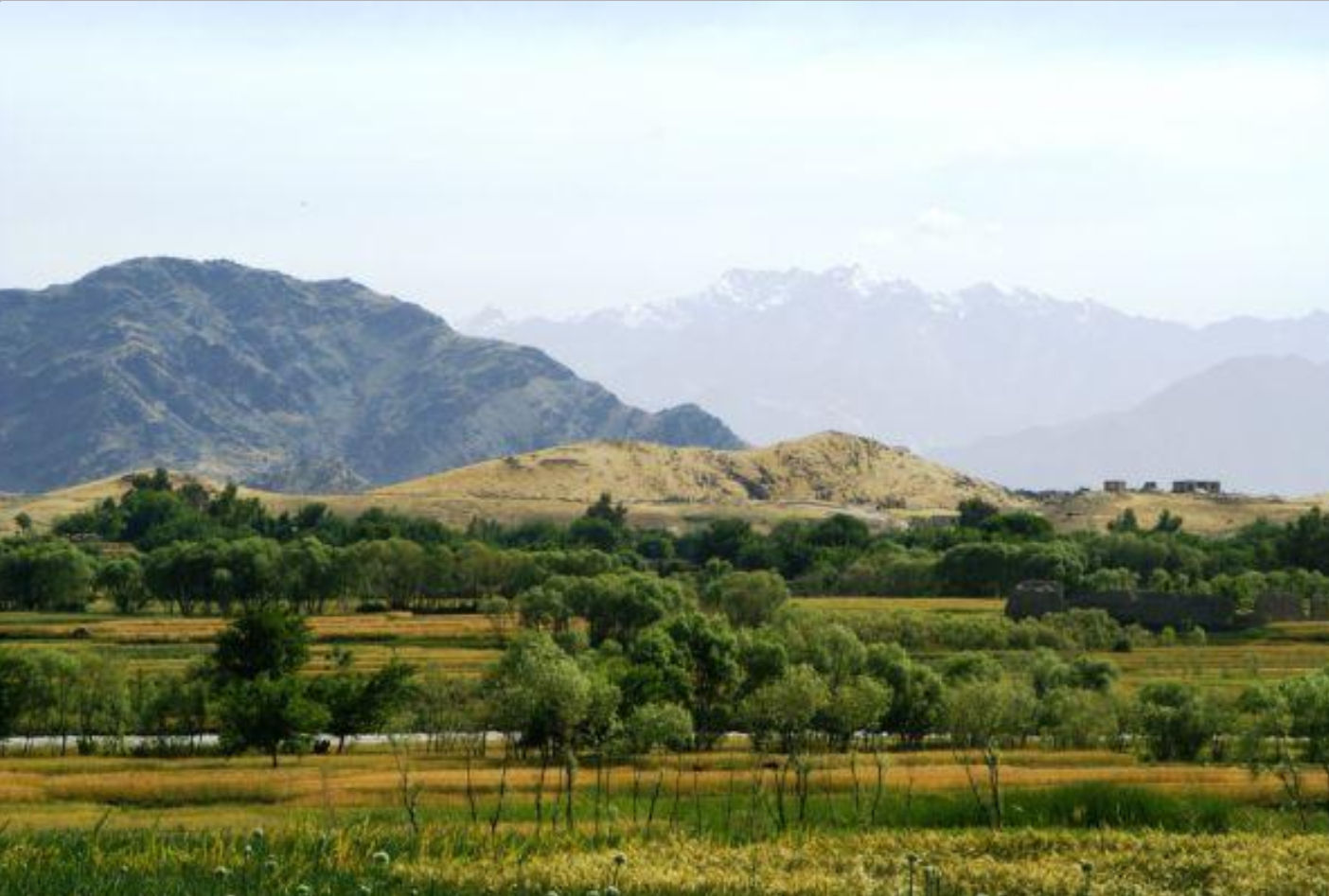
Lampaka valley, Laghman Province.

The Pul-i-Darunteh Aramaic inscription, also called Aramaic inscription of Lampaka, is an inscription on a rock in the valley of Laghman ("Lampaka" being the transcription in Sanskrit of "Laghman"), Afghanistan, written in Aramaic by the Indian emperor Ashoka around 260 BCE. It was discovered in 1932 at a place called Pul-i-Darunteh. Since Aramaic was the official language of the Achaemenid Empire, which disappeared in 320 BCE with the conquests of Alexander the Great, it seems that this inscription was addressed directly to the populations of this ancient empire still present in northwestern India, or to border populations for whom Aramaic remained the language of use.

== Background ==
The discovery of this inscription in 1932 is one of a set of similar inscriptions in Aramaic or Greek (or both together), written by Asoka. In 1915, Sir John Marshall had discovered the Aramaic Inscription of Taxila. In 1958 the famous Bilingual Kandahar Inscription, written in Greek and Aramaic was discovered, and in 1963 the Greek Edicts of Ashoka, again in Kandahar. In the same year 1963 and again in Kandahar, an inscription in "Indo-Aramaic" known as the Kandahar Aramaic inscription or Kandahar II was found, in which the Indian Prakrit language and the Aramaic language alternate, but using only the Aramaic script. The Aramaic parts translate the Indian parts transcribed in the Aramaic alphabet. In 1969, two Belgian anthropologists by chance discovered another Aramaic edict, Aramaic Inscription of Laghman or Lahman I. A few years later, in 1973, Lahmann II followed.

== Content of the inscription ==
The inscription is incomplete. However, the place of discovery, the style of the writing, the vocabulary used, makes it possible to link the inscription to the other Ashoka inscriptions known in the region. In the light of other inscriptions, it has been found that the Pul-i-Darunteh inscription consists of a juxtaposition of Indian and Aramaic languages, all in Aramaic script, and the latter representing translations of the first. This inscription is generally interpreted as a translation of a passage of the Major Pillar Edicts n°5 or n°7, although others have proposed to categorize it among the Minor Rock Edicts of Ashoka.

The Pul-i-Darunteh inscription has been transliterated as follows:

Inscription of Pul-i-Darunteh
Line	Original (Aramaic script)	Transliteration	English translation
1	...𐡕𐡀 𐡐𐡈...	...tʾ pṭ...	
2	...𐡅𐡄 𐡋𐡀𐡍𐡔...	...wh lʾnš...	
3	...𐡅𐡉 𐡎𐡄𐡉𐡕𐡉 𐡋𐡀 𐡈...	...wy shyty lʾ ṭ...	
4	...𐡌𐡎𐡀𐡓𐡕𐡄𐡎 𐡎𐡄𐡉𐡕𐡉 𐡄𐡅...	...msʾrths shyty hw...	
5	...𐡇𐡆𐡄 𐡃𐡉𐡇𐡄𐡉𐡕𐡅𐡉 𐡎𐡄𐡉𐡕𐡉...	...ḥzh dḥhytwy shyty...	
6	...𐡍𐡐𐡓𐡉𐡎 𐡀𐡁𐡄𐡉𐡎𐡉𐡕𐡎 𐡎𐡄𐡉𐡕𐡉...	...nprys ʾbhysyts shyty...	
7	...𐡓𐡉𐡔𐡅 𐡎𐡄𐡉𐡕𐡉 𐡔𐡉𐡌𐡅 𐡋𐡌𐡊𐡕𐡁 𐡁𐡏𐡌...	...ryšw shyty šymw lmktb bʿm...	
8	...𐡀𐡇𐡓𐡉𐡍 𐡄𐡅𐡃𐡏𐡍...	...ʾḥryn hwdʿn...	

== See also ==
- List of Ashoka Edicts
- Kandahar Bilingual Rock Inscription
- Asoka - the Buddhist Emperor of India /Chapter 4 by Vincent Arthur Smith: The Rock Edicts (this version)
