= Lauriya Araraj =

Lauriya-Areraj pillar of Ashoka
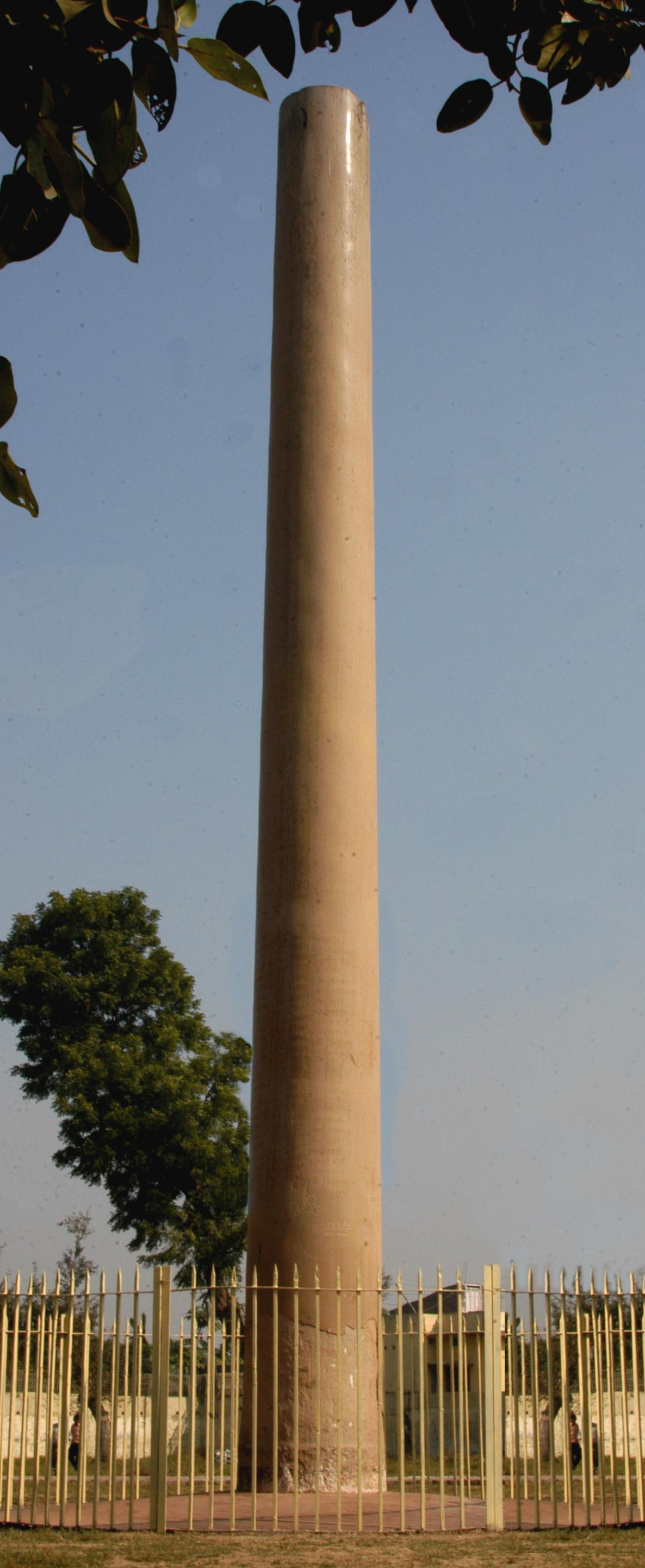
- The Lauriya Areraj Pillar of Ashoka, East Champaran District.
- Material: Polished sandstone
- Period/culture: 3rd century BCE
- Discovered: 26° 33′ 0.82″ N 84° 38′ 51.29″ E
- Place: Lauriya-Areraj, Champaran, India.
- Present location: Lauriya Areraj, India

Location

Lauriya Areraj, also Lauriya Areraj, is a location name in the East Champaran District of the State of Bihar in India.

It is known for the presence of one of the Pillars of Ashoka. The pillar capital is missing, but the pillar bears six Edicts of Ashoka.

Despite the similarity of the names, it is located at a distance of 55 km to the southeast of the other Ashoka pillar at Lauriya Nandangarh.

== Description ==
The pillar, which bears in well-preserved and well-cut letters six of his edicts, is a single block of polished sandstone, 11.12 m (36.5 feet) in height above the ground, with a base diameter of 1.06 m (41.8 inches) and a diameter at the top of 0.95 m (37.6 inches). The weight of this portion only is very nearly 34 tons, but as there must be several feet of the shaft sunk in the earth, the actual weight of the whole block must be little, if any. It has no capital but there can be no doubt that it must once have been crowned with a statue of some animal. These edicts, which date from 242 BC, are most clearly and neatly engraved, and are divided into two distinct portions, that to the north containing 18 lines, and that to the south 23 lines. The edicts deal with different subjects as under:

Edict I – The principle of Government.

Edict ll – The Royal Examples.

Edict lll – Self-examination.

Edict IV – The powers and duties of the Commissioners

Edict V – Regulations restricting slaughter and mutilation of animals.

Edict VI – The necessity for a definite creed.

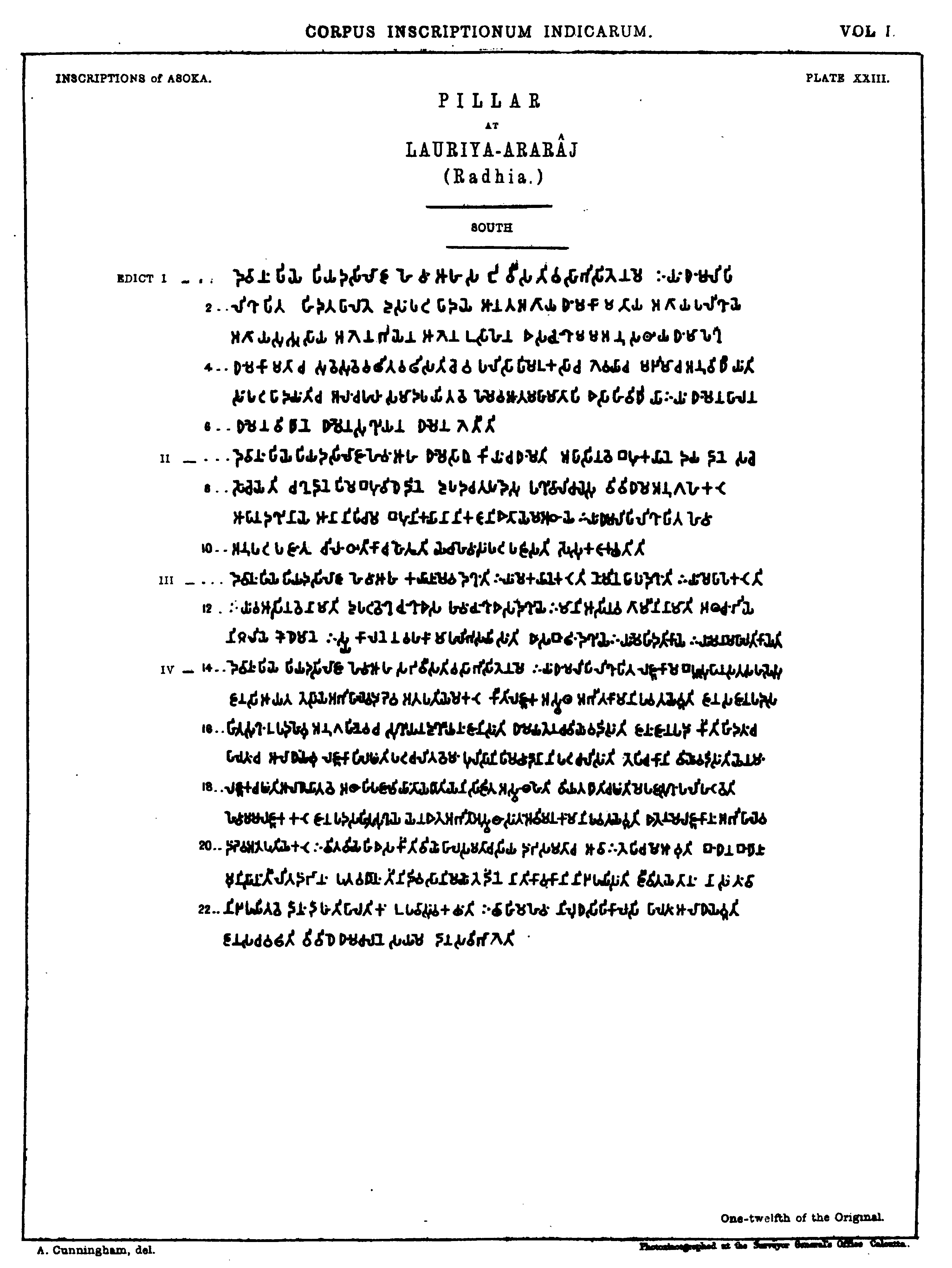
An inscription of Ashoka on the pillar.

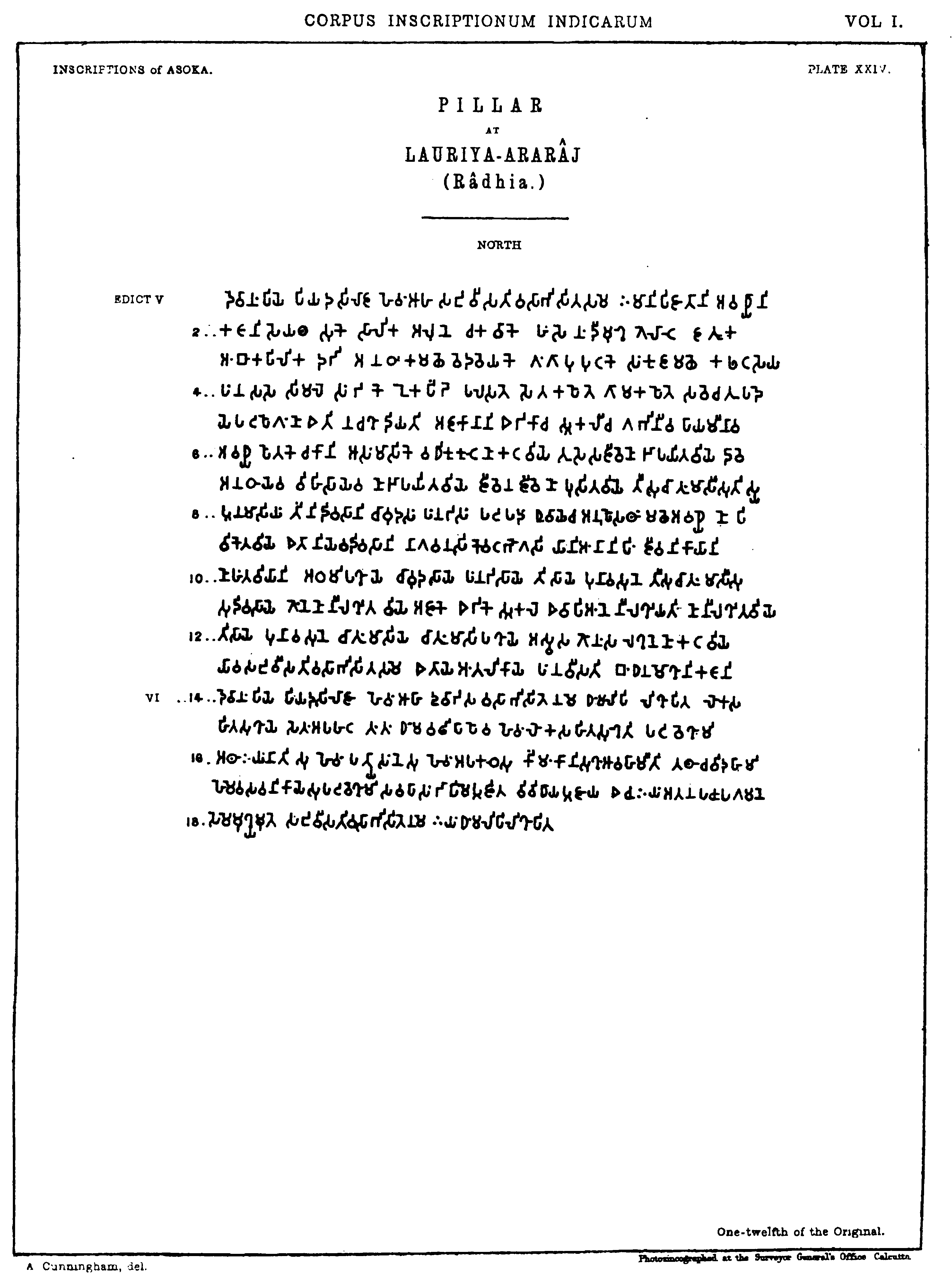
Rest of the inscription by Ashoka.

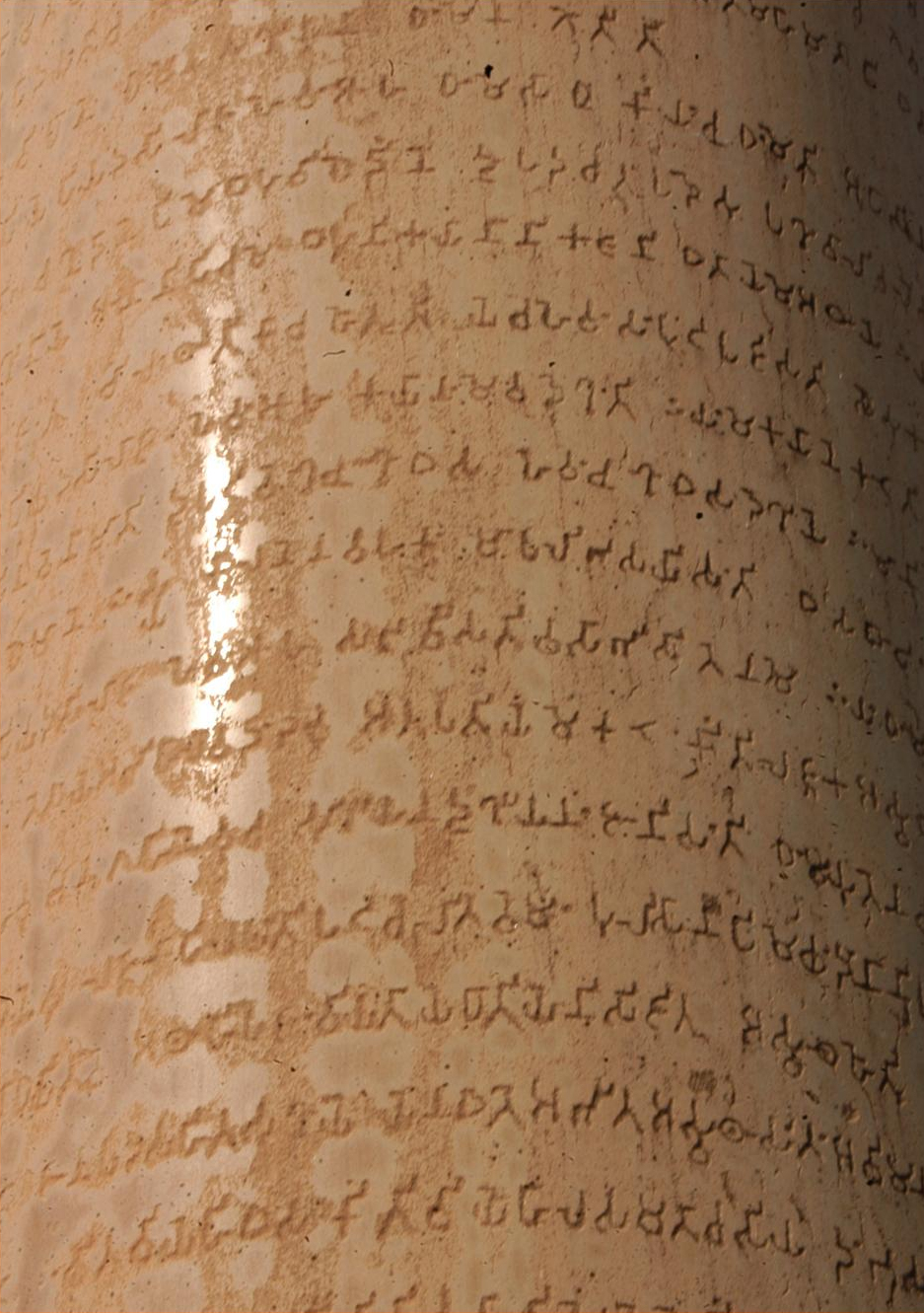
Ashoka Major Pillar Edicts on the pillar.

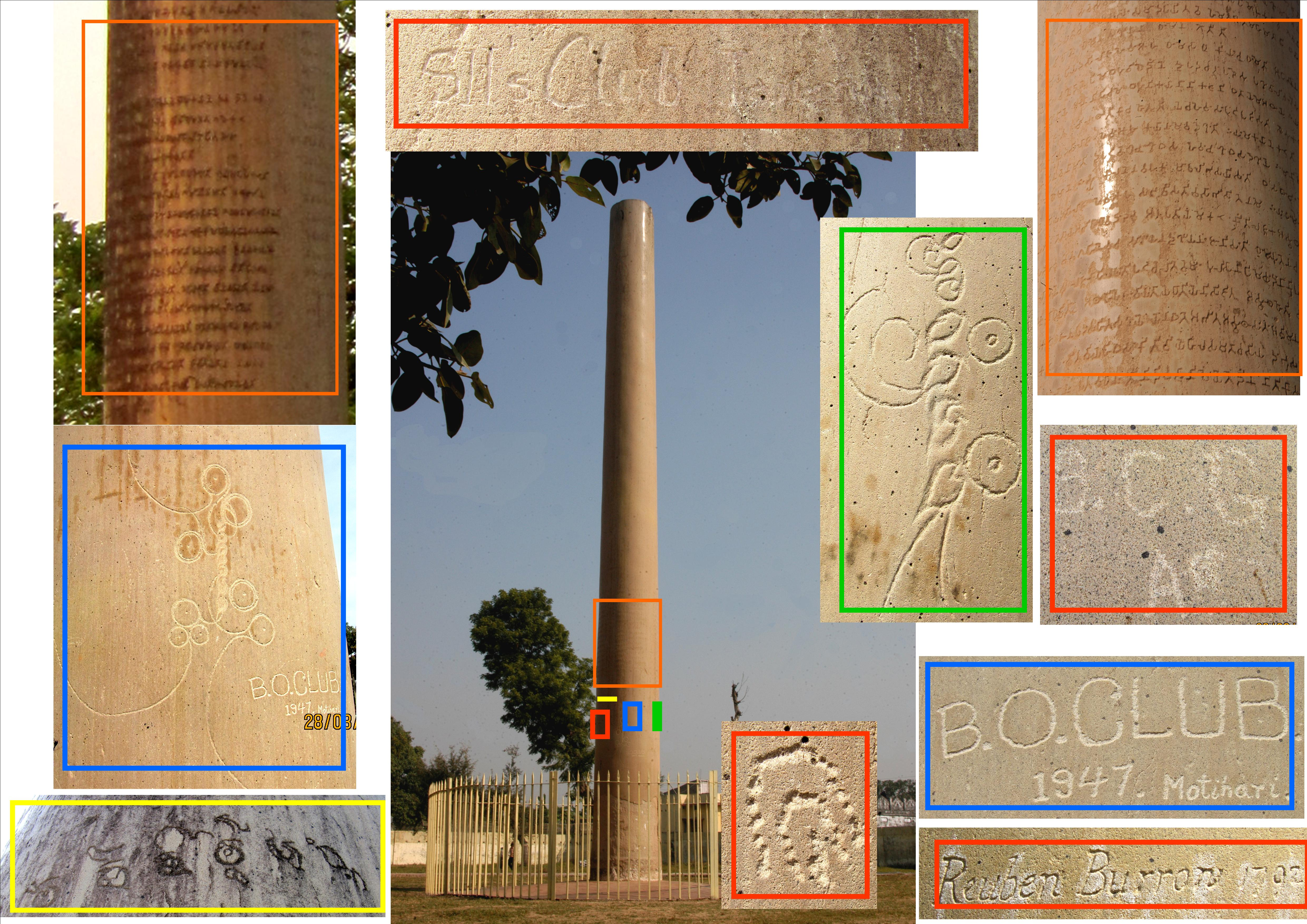
Various inscriptions on the pillar.
