= Mahamatra =

Indian government official

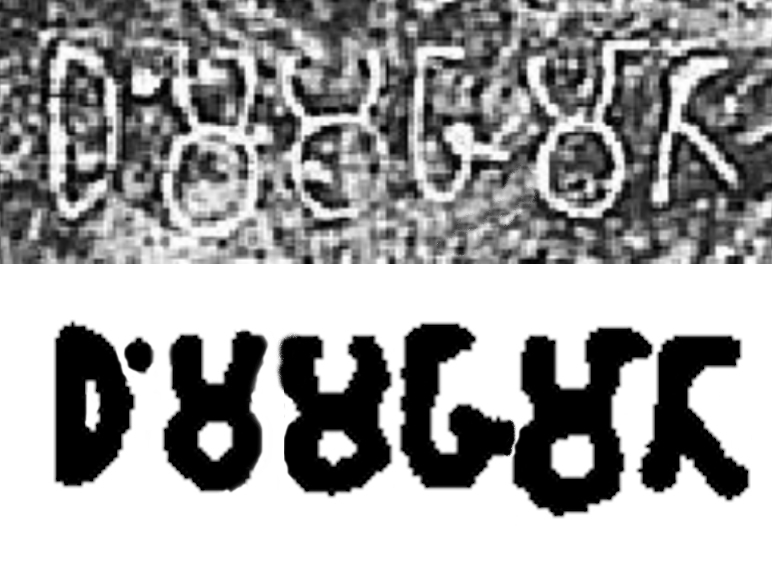
The expression Dhaṃma Mahāmātā, the "Inspectors of the Dharma", established by Ashoka. 7th Major Pillar Edict on the Delhi-Topra pillar, Brahmi script.

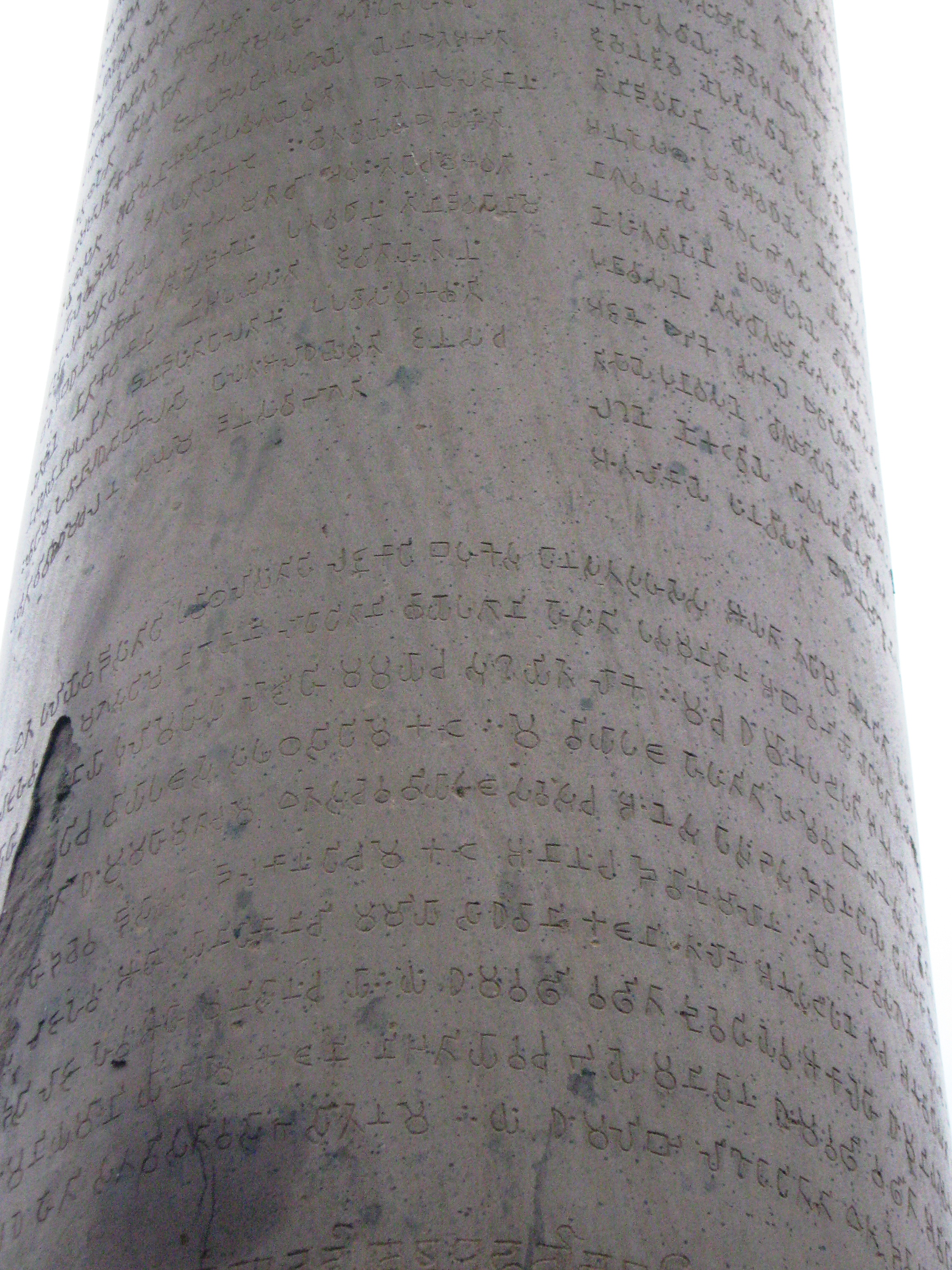
The Mahamatras are mentioned in the Edicts of Ashoka.

A Mahamatra (meaning "Officer of high rank") was an "officer of morality" established by the Indian Maurya Emperor Ashoka (reigned 269-233 BCE). Their full title was Dhaṃma Mahāmātā, the "Inspectors of Dharma". They were apparently a class of senior officials who were in charge various aspects of administration and justice.

The Mahamatras are mentioned in several of the Edicts of Ashoka, inscribed on rocks or pillars. They seem to have been an essential part of his government.

Some were called "Dharma-Mahamatras" ("Mahamatras of Virtue"), who seem to have been established in the 14th year of Ashoka's reign (256 BCE). There were also Amta-mahamatras in charge of foreigners, and Stri-adhyaksha- mahamatras, in charge of women.

Devanampriya Priyadarsin speaks thus. Having in view this very (matter), I have set up pillars of morality, appointed Mahamatras of morality, (and) issued [proclamations] on morality.

— 7th Major Pillar Edict. Translation by E. Hultzsch (1857–1927). Published in India in 1925. Inscriptions of Asoka p.119-. Public Domain.

In the past there were no Dhamma Mahamatras but such officers were appointed by me thirteen years after my coronation. Now they work among all religions for the establishment of dhamma, for the promotion of Dhamma, and for the welfare and happiness of all who are devoted to dhamma. They work among the Greeks, the Kambojas, the Gandharas, the Rastrikas, the Pitinikas and other peoples on the western borders.

— Ashoka Major Rock Edict No.5

Those who are content with their own religion should be told this: the beloved of the gods, King Piyadasi, does not value gifts and honors as much as he values that there should be growth in the essentials of all religions. And to this end many are working - Dhamma Mahamatras, Mahamatras in charge of the women's quarters, officers in charge of outlying areas, and other such officers. And the fruit of this is that one's own religion grows and the dhamma is illuminated also.

— Ashoka Major Rock Edict No.12

Those my Mahamatras of morality too are occupied with affairs of many kinds which are beneficial to ascetics as well as to householders, and they are occupied also with all sects. Some (Mahamatras) were ordered by me to busy themselves with the affairs of the Sangha; likewise others were ordered by me to busy themselves also with the Brahmanas (and) Ajivikas; others were ordered by me to busy themselves also with the Nirgranthas; others were ordered by me to busy themselves also with various (other) sects; (thus) different Mahamatras (are busying themselves) specially with different (congregations). But my Mahamatras of morality are occupied with these (congregations) as well as with all other sects.

— 7th Major Pillar Edict. Translation by E. Hultzsch (1857–1927). Published in India in 1925. Inscriptions of Asoka p.119-. Public Domain.
