= Beth =

Beth may refer to:

== Letter and number ==
- Bet (letter), or beth, the second letter of the Semitic abjads (writing systems)
- Hebrew word for "house", often used in the name of synagogues and schools (e.g. Beth Israel)
- Beth number, a sequence of infinite cardinal numbers in mathematics

== Name ==
- Beth (given name) lists people with the given name Beth
- Beth (singer), Elisabeth Rodergas Cols (born 1981)
- Beth (surname)

== Other uses ==
- "Beth" (song), by the band Kiss
- The Beths, New Zealand band
- List of storms named Beth

== See also ==
- Bayt/Beit/Beth/Bet (disambiguation), meaning 'house' in various Semitic languages; part of many place-names
- Bet (disambiguation)
- Bethia, a given name
- Elizabeth (disambiguation)
