= Bethia =

Bethia is a female given name. People with that name include:

- Bethia Clarke (1867–1959), British artist
- Bethia Foott (1907–1995), Australian non-fiction writer
- Lucy Bethia Walford (1845–1915), Scottish novelist and artist

== See also ==
- Beth (disambiguation)
- Bettiah, a city in the state of Bihar, India
