= Bethia Clarke =

British artist

- Born: 1867; Blackheath, London, England
- Died: 1959 (aged 91–92); Kensington, London
- Known for: Painting

Bethia Mary Clarke (1867–1959) was a British artist known for her paintings of portraits, landscapes and interior scenes.

== Biography ==
Clarke was born at Blackheath in London and grew up in Hastings before studying art at Westminster, in Paris and at Etaples. Living in London, and sometimes in Eastbourne and often travelling overseas, Clarke painted portraits, landscapes and interior scenes in oils and watercolour and also created pastel drawings. Between 1892 and 1953 Clarke was a prolific contributor to group exhibitions. She was a regular exhibitor at both the Royal Academy and the Royal Society of British Artists in London and with the Royal Glasgow Institute of the Fine Arts. She received an honourable mention for an exhibit at the Paris Salon. Clarke showed some 48 works with the Society of Women Artists and was elected a full member of the Society in 1950. She was also a member of The Pastel Society and of the Forum Club. Clarke died at Kensington in London in March 1959.
