= E. Hultzsch =

German indologist and epigraphist

Eugen Julius Theodor Hultzsch
- Born: 29 March 1857; Dresden, Kingdom of Saxony
- Died: 16 January 1927 (aged 69); Halle (Saale), Germany
- Occupations: Indologist, Sanskritist, epigraphist

Eugen Julius Theodor Hultzsch (29 March 1857 – 16 January 1927) was a German indologist and epigraphist who is known for his work in deciphering the inscriptions of Ashoka.

== Early life and education ==
Born in Dresden on 29 March 1857, Hultzsch studied at the Dresden College of the Sacred Cross and the University of Lipsia, where he studied Oriental languages. On completion of his graduation, Hultzsch moved to Vienna, where his passion for Sanskrit began. In 1886, Hultzsch moved to and settled down in India, where he was employed by the Archaeological Survey of India (ASI) as Chief Epigraphist to the Government of Madras.

== Career in epigraphy ==
Hultzsch joined the Archaeological Survey of India (ASI) in 1886 when the epigraphy section of the ASI was formed and was the ASI's first chief epigraphist. Hultzsch deciphered inscriptions in a number of Hindu temples in South India and later published them. He edited volumes 3 to 8 and a part of volume 9 of Epigraphia Indica.

Among his best known work are his decipherment of the inscriptions of the Mauryan emperor Ashoka. In South India, he is remembered for his deciphering of the inscriptions in the Pancha Rathas in December 1886 and the Brihadeeswarar Temple in Thanjavur in October 1887. The inscriptions on the Pancha Rathas were published in volume one of the book South Indian Inscriptions while those of the Brihadeeswarar Temple in volume 2.

== Later life ==
In 1903, Hultzsch resigned from the ASI and returned to Europe, where he served as professor of Sanskrit at the University of Halle. Hultzsch was succeeded as Chief Epigraphist by Valaiyattur Venkayya. Hultzsch died in Halle (Saale) on 16 January 1927 at the age of sixty-nine.
