= Rampurva capitals =

Capitals of a pair of Ashoka Pillars

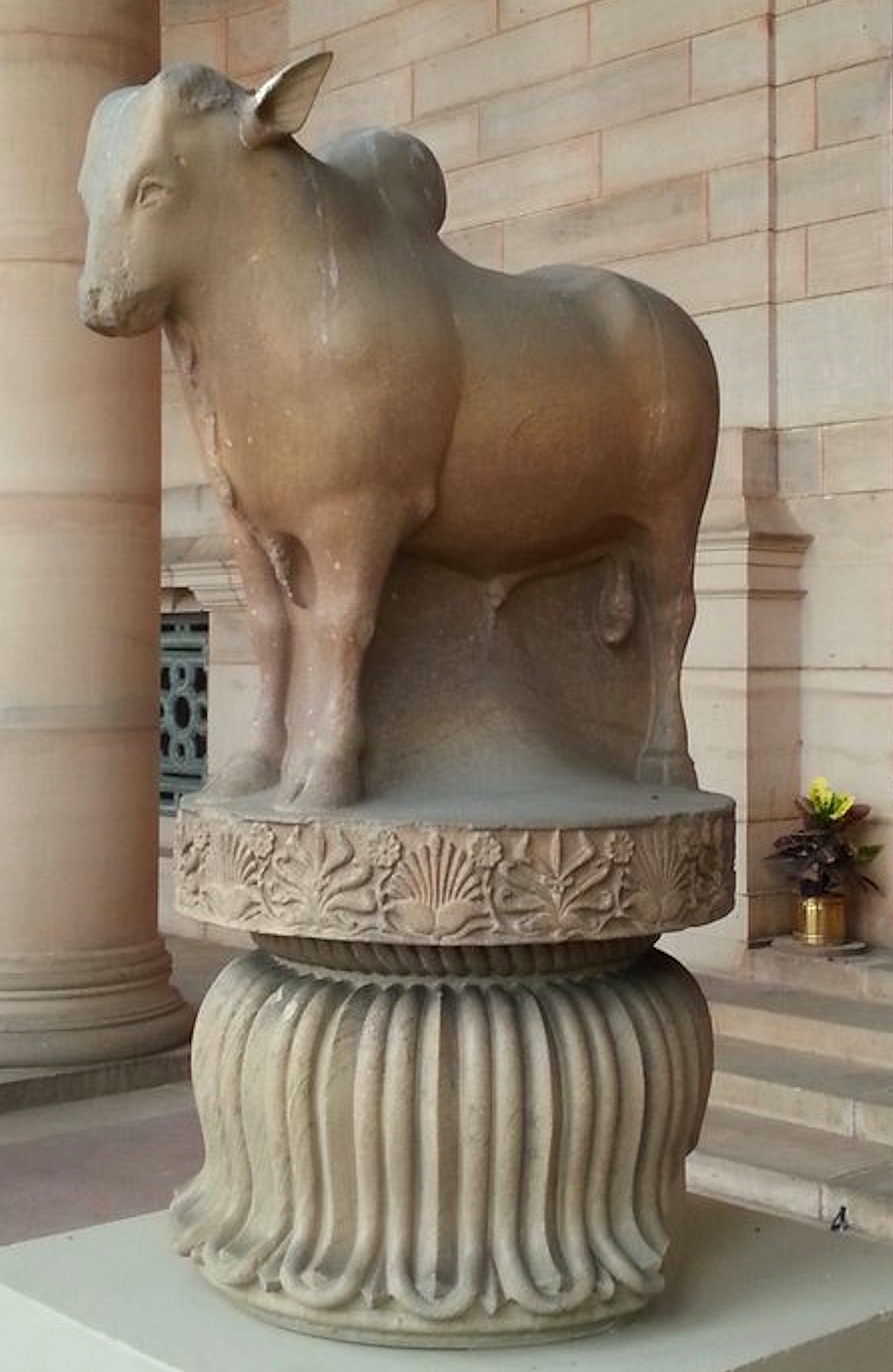
- Original bull capital of Rampurva, one of the Pillars of Ashoka, now located in the Presidential Palace of Rashtrapati Bhavan, New Delhi. 3rd century BCE.

- Location within India Location within Bihar
- 27°16′11.75″N 84°29′58.08″E
- Type: Settlement
- Location: West Champaran district, Bihar, India.

The Rampurva capitals are the capitals of a pair of Ashoka Pillars discovered in c. 1876 by A. C. L. Carlleyle. The archaeological site is called Rampurva, and is located in the West Champaran district of the Indian state of Bihar, situated very close to the border with Nepal. The lion capital is now in the Indian Museum in Kolkata, while the bull capital is located at the center of the porch of the Rashtrapati Bhavan, the Indian Presidential Palace.

== Buddhist significance ==
Waddell in 1896 suggested that the death or parinirvana of Gautama Buddha was in the region of Rampurva: "I believe that Kusīnagara, where the Buddha died may be ultimately found to the North of Bettiah, and in the line of the Açōka pillars which lead hither from Patna (Pāțaliputra)." Modern scholarship, based on archaeological evidence, believes that the Buddha died in Kushinagar (Uttar Pradesh).

== Rampurava lion capital ==
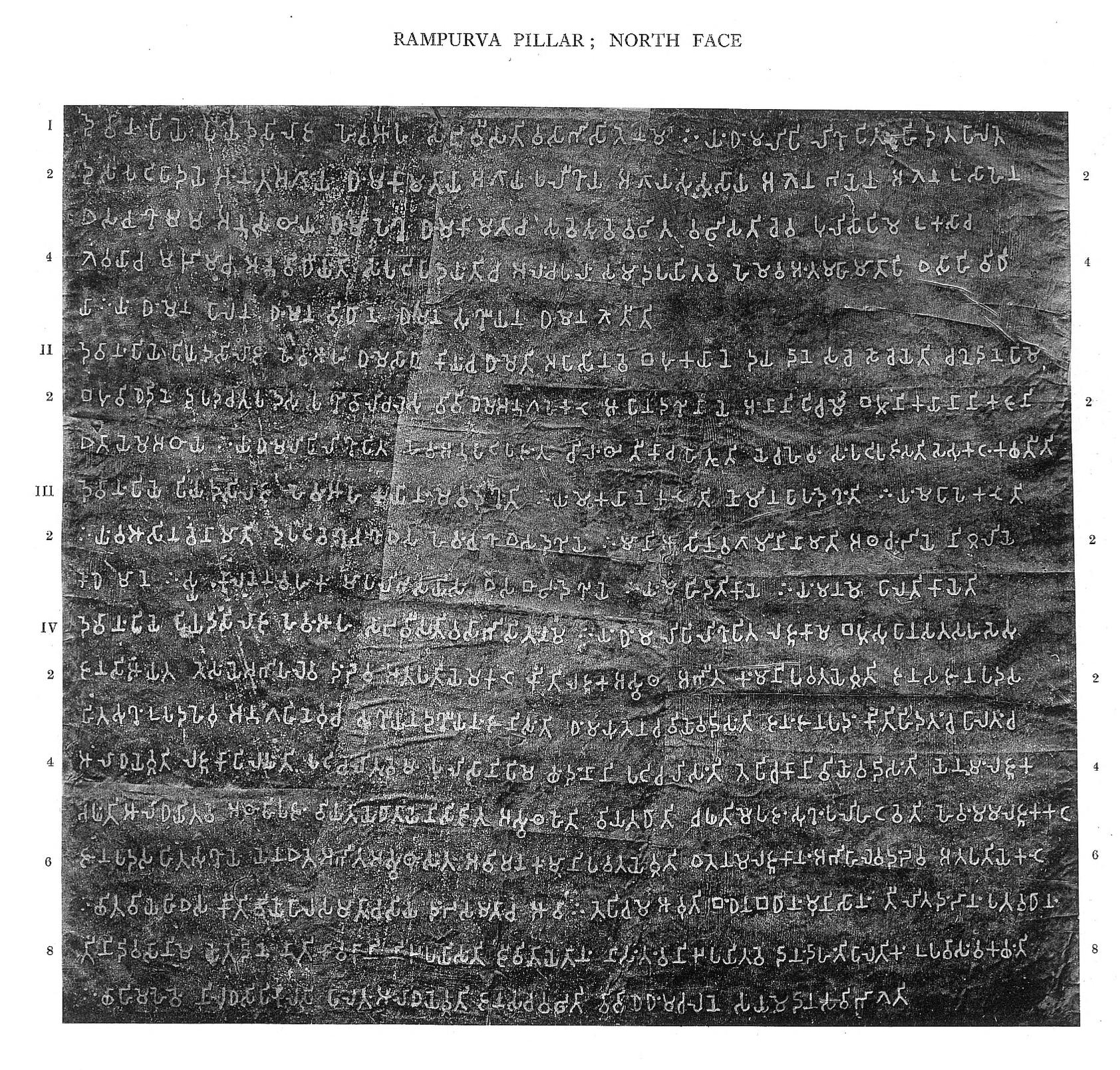
Rampurva edicts on the lion pillar.

The lion pillar is inscribed with the Major Pillar Edicts of the Edicts of Ashoka, Pillar Edicts I, II, III, IV, V, VI.

== Rampurva bull capital ==
The Rampurva bull capital is noted as one of the seven remaining animal capitals from the Pillars of Ashoka. It is composed of a lotiform base, with an abacus decorated with floral designs, and the realistic depiction of a zebu bull.

The abacus in particular displays a strong influence of Greek art: it is composed of honeysuckles alternated with stylized palmettes and small rosettes. A similar kind of capital can be seen at the basis of the Sankassa elephant capital. A similar frieze is also visible on the Diamond throne built by Ashoka at Bodh Gaya. These design likely originated in Greek and Near-Eastern arts.

The bull is without inscriptions, presumably because its twin pillar, the Rampurava lion pillar already had them and therefore there was no need to repeat. It is thought that the bull symbol is not related to the bull Nandi of Hinduism, as Ashoka was quite eclectic in his choice of animals for his pillars anyway: lions, elephants, camels, geese, and horses are known.

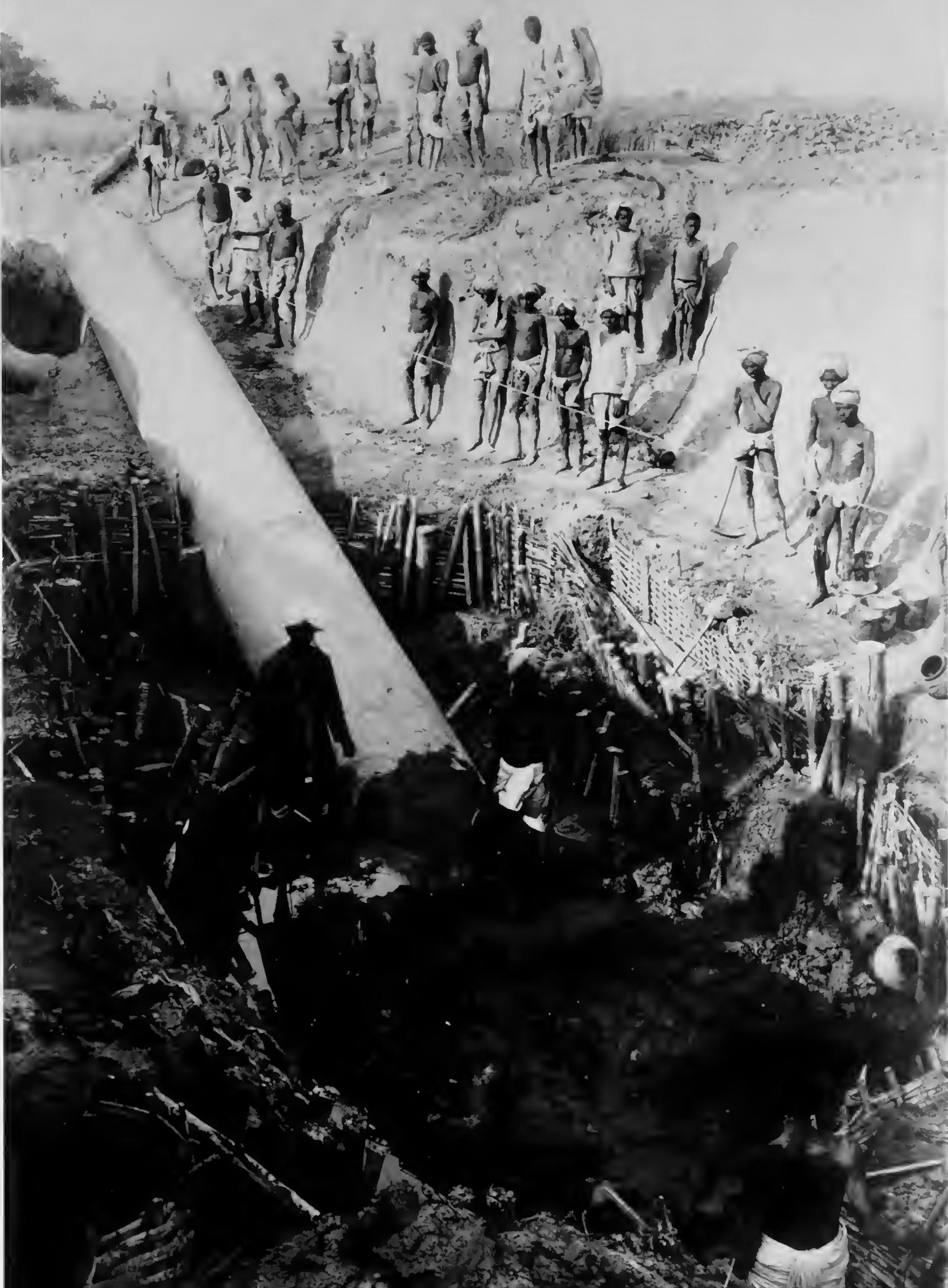
Rampurva pillar excavation 1877.

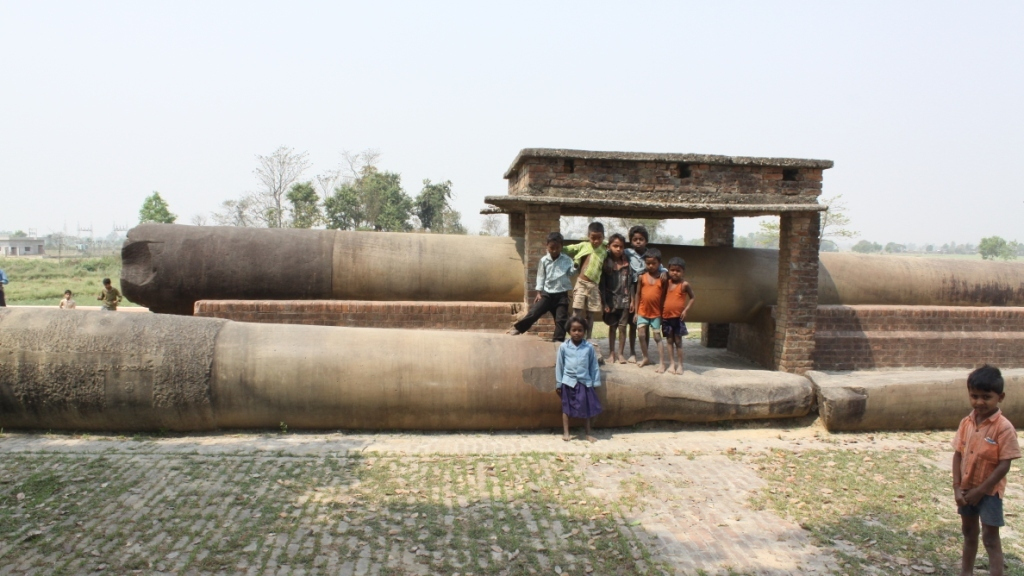
Remains of the pillars today.

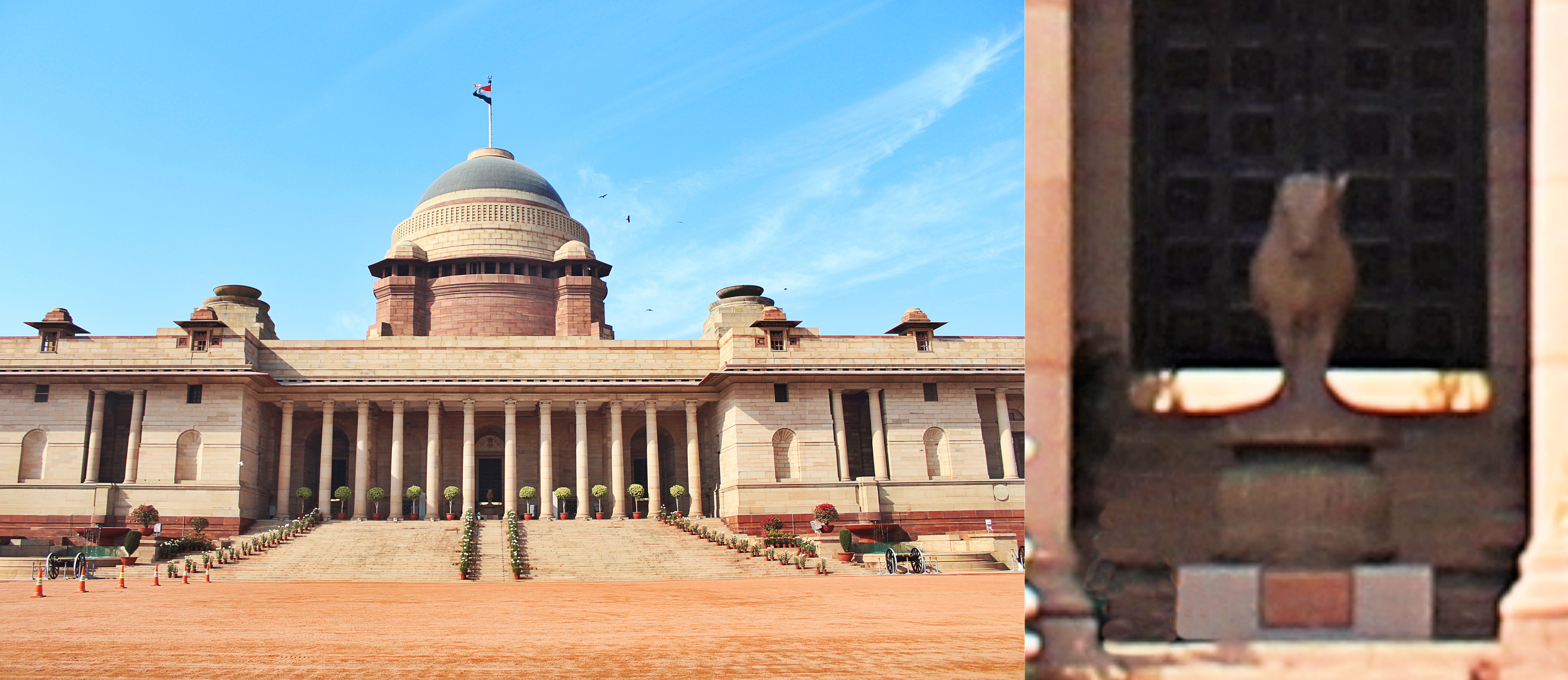
Original Rampurva bull up the stairs of Rashtrapati Bhavan, New Delhi.

Rampurva capitals
Lion capital	Rampurva lion excavation in 1907. Front, right quarter. The abacus is decorated with hamsa geese. Front, left quarter Left side Back, left quarter Back, right quarter
Bull capital	Rampurva bull excavation in 1907. Rampurva bull at time of discovery. Rampurva bull, front Rampurva bull, in profile Rampurva bull, left side

== See also ==
- Pillars of Ashoka
- Edicts of Ashoka
- Early Indian epigraphy
