= South Indian Inscriptions =

Archaeological publication series

South Indian Inscriptions is an epigraphical series that has been published by the Archaeological Survey of India in 34 volumes from 1890 through the present. The texts are supplemented with summaries and an overview of the texts, both in English The series was originally edited by archaeologist E. Dinesh, then V. Venkayya and Rai Bahadur.

== Volumes ==
- I: Tamil and Sanskrit Inscriptions from Stone and Copper-plate Edicts at Mamallapuram, Kanchipuram, in the North Arcot District, and other parts of the Madras Presidency. Chiefly collected in 1886–87.
- II: Tamil Inscriptions of Rajaraja, Rajendra-Chola, and others in the Rajarajesvara Temple at Tanjavur.
  - Part I: Inscriptions on the Walls of the Central Shrine, with Four Plates.
  - Part II: Inscriptions on the Walls of the Enclosure, with Four Plates.
- Part III: Supplement to the First and Second Volumes, with Eight Plates.
- Part IV: Other Inscriptions of the Temple.
- Part V: Pallava Copper-Plate Grants from Velurpalayam and Tandantottam (with Two Plates), including Title Page, Preface, Table of Contents, List of Plates, Addenda and Corrigenda, Introduction and Index of Volume II.
- III: Miscellaneous Inscriptions of the Tamil Country:
  - Part I: Inscriptions at Ukkal, Melpadi, Karuvur, Manimangalam, and Tiruvallam.
  - Part II: Inscriptions of Virarajendra I, Kulottunga-Chola I, Vikrama-Chola and Kulottunga-Chola III.
  - Part III: Inscriptions of Aditya I, Parantaka I, Madiraikonda Rajakesarivarman, Parantaka II, Uttama-Chola, Parthivendravarman, Aditya-Karikala, and the Tiruvalangadu Plates.
  - Part IV: Copper-plate Grants from Sinnamanur, Tirukkalar, and Tiruchchengodu.
- IV: Miscellaneous Inscriptions from the Tamil, Telugu and Kannada Countries and Ceylon (with Eleven Plates).
- V: Miscellaneous Inscriptions from the Tamil, Malayalam, Telugu and Kannada Countries (with Three Plates).
- VI: Miscellaneous Inscriptions from the Tamil, Telugu and Kannada Countries (with Five Plates).
- VII: Miscellaneous Inscriptions from the Tamil, Malayalam, Telugu and Kannada Countries.
- VIII: Miscellaneous Inscriptions from the Tamil, Malayalam, Telugu and Kannada Countries.
- IX: (Parts I and II) Kannada Inscriptions from the Madras Presidency.
- X: Telugu Inscriptions from Andhra Pradesh
- XI: Bombay-Karnataka Inscriptions
- XII: Pallava Inscriptions
- XIII: Chola Inscriptions
- XIV: Pandya Inscriptions
- XV: Bombay-Karnataka Inscriptions
- XVI: Telugu Inscriptions of the Vijayanagara Dynasty
- XVII: Inscriptions collected during the year 1903-04
- XVIII:
- XIX: Inscriptions of Parakesarivarman
- XX: Bombay-Karnataka Inscriptions
- XXI:
- XXII: (Parts I, II and III) Inscriptions collected during 1906
- XXIII:
- XXIV:
- XXV:
- XXVI: Inscriptions collected during the year 1908-09
- XXVII:
- XXVIII:
- XXIX:
- XXX:
- XXXI:
- XXXII:
- XXXIII:
- XXXIV:

== See also ==
- Related topics
  - Ancient iron production
  - Ashokan Edicts in Delhi
  - Ashoka's Major Rock Edicts
  - Dhar iron pillar
  - History of metallurgy in South Asia
  - Iron pillar of Delhi
  - List of Edicts of Ashoka
  - Pillars of Ashoka
- Other similar topics
  - Early Indian epigraphy
  - Hindu temple architecture
  - History of India
  - Indian copper plate inscriptions
  - Indian rock-cut architecture
  - List of rock-cut temples in India
  - Outline of ancient India
