= List of edicts of Ashoka =

List of the Edicts of Ashoka
- Created: 3rd century BCE
- Present location: India, Pakistan, Afghanistan, Bangladesh

Location
- Location of the Minor Rock Edicts (Edicts 1, 2 & 3); Other inscriptions often classified as Minor Rock Edicts; Location of the Major Rock Edicts; Location of the Minor Pillar Edicts; Original location of the Major Pillar Edicts; Capital cities

The following is an overview of Edicts of Ashoka, and where they are located.

== Minor Rock Edicts ==
- Kandahar, Afghanistan
- Lampaka, Afghanistan
- Bahapur, Delhi
- Bairat, near Jaipur, Rajasthan
- Bhabru, second hill at Bairat, Rajasthan
- Gujarra, near Jhansi, Datia district, Madhya Pradesh
- Rupnath, on the Kaimur Hills near Jabalpur, Madhya Pradesh
- Ratanpurwa, on the Kaimur Hills near Kharauli-Basaha Road, Bihar
- Panguraria, Sehore district, Madhya Pradesh
- Sohgaura, Gorakhpur district, Uttar Pradesh
- Sahasram, Rohtas district, Bihar
- Barabar Caves, Bihar (donatory inscriptions to the Ājīvika sect)
- Mahasthan, Bogra district, Bangladesh
- Rajula-Mandagiri, near Pattikonda, Kurnool district, Andhra Pradesh
- Jonnagiri, Kurnool district, Andhra Pradesh
- Palkigundu and Gavimath, Koppal district, Karnataka
- Brahmagiri, Chitradurga district, Karnataka
- Jatinga-Rameshwara, near Brahmagiri, Karnataka
- Siddapur, near Brahmagiri, Karnataka
- Maski, Raichur district, Karnataka
- Nittur, Bellary district, Karnataka
- Udegolam, Bellary district, Karnataka

== Minor Pillar Edicts ==
- Lumbini (Rummindei), Rupandehi district, Nepal (the upper part broke off when struck by lightning; the original horse capital mentioned by Xuanzang is missing)
- Nigali-Sagar (or Nigliva), near Lumbini, Rupandehi district, Nepal (originally near the Buddha Konakarnana stupa)
- Sarnath, near Varanasi, Uttar Pradesh (Pillar Inscription, Schism Edict)
- Allahabad, Uttar Pradesh (originally located at Kausambi and probably moved to Allahabad by Jahangir; Pillar Edicts I-VI, Queen's Edict, Schism Edict)
- Sanchi, near Bhopal, Madhya Pradesh (Schism Edict)

== Major Rock Edicts (set of 14) ==
- Kandahar Greek Inscription (portions of Rock Edicts 12 and 13in Greek) and Kandahar Bilingual Rock Inscription (bilingual Greek-Aramaic), in Kandahar, Afghanistan.
- Shahbazgarhi, Khyber Pakhtunkhwa, Pakistan (in Kharosthi script)
- Mansehra Rock Edicts, Mansehra, Khyber Pakhtunkhwa province, Pakistan (in Kharosthi script)
- Kalsi, near Chakrata, Dehradun district, Uttarakhand
- Girnar, near Junagadh, Gujarat (Ashoka's Major Rock Edict)
- Sopara, Thane district, Maharashtra (fragments Rock Edicts 8 and 9)
- Dhauli, near Bhubaneswar, Orissa (includes Kalinga Edict, excludes Rock Edicts 11–13)
- Jaugada, Ganjam district, Orissa (includes Kalinga Edict, excludes Rock Edicts 11–13)
- Sannati, Kalaburagi district, Karnataka (separate Rock Edicts 1 and 2, fragments Rock Edicts 13 and 14)
- Yerragudi, near Gooty, Kurnool district, Andhra Pradesh (Major Rock Edicts and Minor Rock Edict)

== Major Pillar Edicts (set of 7) ==
- Kandahar, Afghanistan (fragments of Pillar Edicts VII)
- Ranigat, Khyber Pakhtunkhwa, Pakistan
- Delhi-Meerut, Delhi ridge, Delhi (Pillar Edicts I, II, III, IV, V, VI; moved from Meerut to Delhi by Feroz Shah)
- Delhi-Topra, Feroz Shah Kotla, Delhi (Pillar Edicts I, II, III, IV, V, VI, VII; moved from Topra to Delhi by Feroz Shah)
- Vaishali, Bihar (has no inscription)
- Rampurva, Champaran, Bihar (Pillar Edicts I, II, III, IV, V, VI)
- Lauriya-Nandangarth, Champaran, Bihar (Pillar Edicts I, II, III, IV, V, VI)
- Lauriya-Araraj, Champaran, Bihar (Pillar Edicts I, II, III, IV, V, VI)

== See also ==
- Related topics
  - Ancient iron production
  - Ashokan Edicts in Delhi
  - Ashoka's Major Rock Edicts
  - Dhar iron pillar
  - Gandharan Buddhism
  - Greco-Buddhism
  - History of metallurgy in South Asia
  - Iron pillar of Delhi
  - Pillars of Ashoka
  - Stambha
- Other similar topics
  - Burmese pagoda
  - Early Indian epigraphy
  - Buddhist temple architecture
  - History of India
  - Indian copper plate inscriptions
  - Indian rock-cut architecture
  - List of rock-cut temples in India
  - Outline of ancient India
  - South Indian Inscriptions
  - Tagundaing
