= André Dupont-Sommer =

French semitologist and Biblical scholar (1900–1983)

André Dupont-Sommer (23 December 1900, Marnes-la-Coquette – 14 May 1983, Paris) was a French semitologist. He specialized in the history of Judaism around the beginning of the Common Era, and especially the Dead Sea Scrolls. He was a graduate of the Sorbonne and he taught at various institutions in France including the Collége de France (1963–1971) where he held the chair of Hebrew and Aramaic.

== Dead Sea scrolls ==
Dupont-Sommer became interested in the Dead Sea scrolls not long after they were discovered. His first article on them was published in 1949. Writing in French he soon published an overview of the scrolls, Aperçus préliminaires sur les manuscrits de la Mer Morte, which was translated into English in 1952 as The Dead-Sea Scrolls: A Preliminary Survey by Margaret Rowley. He was a strong advocate of the Essene connection with the Dead Sea scrolls and in this work he argued for the Essene origin of Christianity. Although his ideas about Christianity were not taken up by the scholarly community, his writings contributed to a better understanding of the scrolls.

== Partial bibliography ==
=== Books ===
- Aperçus préliminaires sur les manuscrits de la mer Morte, Adrien-Maisonneuve, Paris, 1950; The Dead-Sea Scrolls: A Preliminary Survey, trans. E. Margaret Rowley, New York: The Macmillan Company, 1952.
- Nouveaux Aperçus sur les manuscrits de la mer Morte, Adrien-Maisonneuve, 1953
- Les écrits esséniens découverts près de la mer Morte, Payot, 1959

=== Articles ===
- Une bilingue gréco-araméenne d'Aśoka, Journal Asiatique 246, 1958, pp. 1–48 (with Daniel Schlumberger, Louis Robert, and Emile Benveniste)
- Une nouvelle inscription araméenne d'Asoka découverte à Kandahar (Afghanistan) Comptes rendus des séances de l'Académie des Inscriptions et Belles-Lettres Année 1966 110–3 pp. 440–451
- Une inscription indo-araméenne d'Asoka provenant de Kandahar, Journal Asiatique 254, 1966, pp. 437–465 (with Émile Benveniste)
- Une nouvelle inscription araméenne d'Asoka trouvée dans la vallée du Laghman (Afghanistan) Comptes rendus des séances de l'Académie des Inscriptions et Belles-Lettres, Year 1970 114–1 pp. 158–173
- Essénisme et Bouddhisme, Comptes rendus des séances de l'Académie des Inscriptions et Belles-Lettres Année 1980 124–4 pp. 698–715

== Sources ==
- André Caquot, André Dupont-Sommer 1900–1983
- Jacques Briend, in Encyclopedia of the Dead Sea Scrolls Vol.1, Edd. Schiffman, Lawrence H., VanderKam, James C. (Oxford: OUP, 2000) people p. 220–221.
- Die essenischen Schriftem vom Toten Meer. Unter Zugrundelegung der Originaltexte übers. von Walter W. Müller. Tübingen, Mohr, 1960.
