= Major Rock Edicts =

10 separate edicts of Mauryan emperor Ashoka across South Asia

Major Rock Edicts of Ashoka
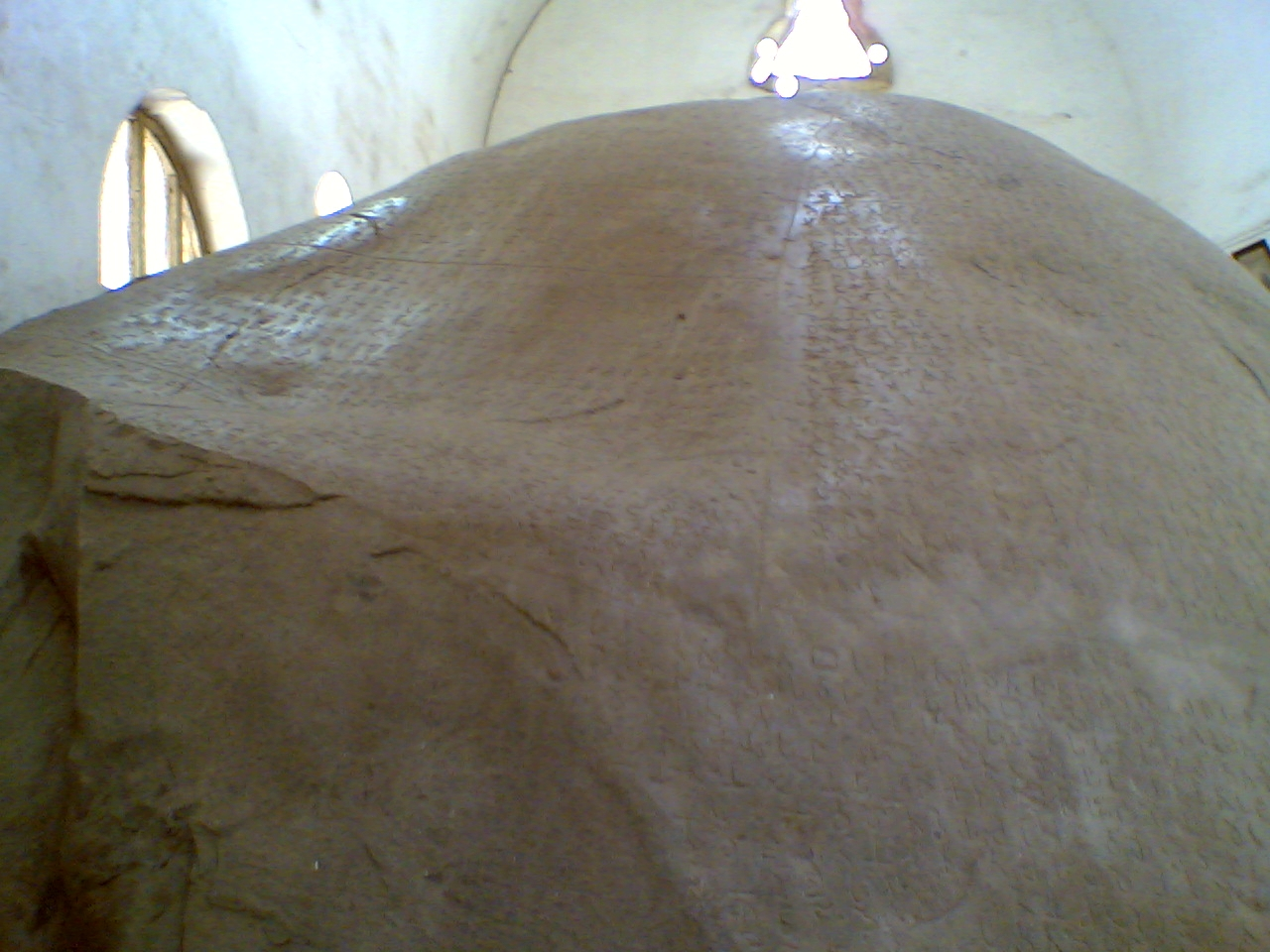
- Ashoka's Rock Edict at Junagadh
- Material: Rocks
- Created: 3rd century BCE
- Present location: India, Pakistan, Afghanistan

Location
- Location of the Major Rock Edicts.

The Major Rock Edicts of Indian emperor Ashoka refer to 14 separate major Edicts of Ashoka which are significantly detailed and represent some of the earliest dated rock inscriptions of any Indian monarch. These edicts are preceded chronologically by the Minor Rock Edicts.

== History ==
Ashoka was the third monarch of the Maurya Empire in the subcontinent, reigning from around 269 BCE. Ashoka famously converted to Buddhism and renounced violence soon after being victorious in a gruesome Kalinga War, yet filled with deep remorse for the bloodshed of the war, but findings suggest that he had already converted to Buddhism 4 years before the war. Although he was a major historical figure, little definitive information was known as there were few records of his reign until the 19th century when a large number of his edicts, inscribed on rocks and pillars, were found in India, Nepal, Pakistan and Afghanistan. In India, Places where rock edicts were found are – Kalsi, Uttarakhand; Sopara, Maharashtra; Mount Girnar, Gujarat; Erragudi, Andhra Pradesh; Dhauli, Odisha; Jaugada, Odisha. These many edicts, of which Ashoka's Major Rock Edicts were the first and most impressive, were concerned with practical instructions in running a kingdom such as the design of irrigation systems and descriptions of Ashoka's beliefs in peaceful moral behavior. They contain little personal detail about his life.

Archaeologist Namita Sugandhi dates the Major Rock Edicts to circa 257 BCE during the twelfth or 13th year of Asoka's rule, around the same time - or even a year after - the creation of the Minor Rock Edicts. She found Erragudi to be interesting because Minor Rock Edicts I and II were found there with all 14 Major Rock Edicts. The Erragudi edicts are inscribed on six boulders in the Yenakonda or Nallayenakonda ("black elephant hillock") hills.

=== Authorship ===
The Major Rock Edicts are very generally attributed to Ashoka. Strictly speaking though, the inscriptions of the Major Rock Edicts, just as those of the Major Pillar Edicts, are not inscribed in the name of "Ashoka", but in the name of "Devanampriya" ("Beloved of the God", thought to be a general regnal title like "Our Lord"), "Devanampriya Priyadasi" ("Our Lord Priyadasi", or literally "Our Lord who glances amicably") or "Devanampriya Priyadasi Raja" ("Our Lord the King Priyadasi"). This title also appears in Greek in the Kandahar Bilingual Rock Inscription, when naming the author of the proclamation as βασιλεὺς Πιοδασσης ("King Piyodasses"), and in Aramaic in the same inscription as "our lord, king Priyadasin".

The association of the Major inscriptions with "Ashoka" is only a reconstruction based on the 3rd-4th century CE Dipavamsa which associates the name "Ashoka" with the name "Priyadarsi", and an extrapolation based on the fact that the name "Ashoka" appears with the title "Devanampriya" ("Beloved of the Gods") in a few of the Minor Rock Edicts. Christopher Beckwith has suggested that "Priyadarsi" was a king in his own right, probably the son of Chandragupta Maurya known to the Greeks as Amitrochates, and Ashoka was either just a Buddhist legend or a much later king who authored the Buddhist Minor Rock Edicts around the 1st century CE.

Conversely, the Major Rock Edicts in the name of King Priyadasi do not have a clear Buddhist character, being mainly codes of conduct gathered under the name of "Dharma" (translated as Eusebeia ("Piety") in Greek and "Truth" in Aramaic in the Kandahar Bilingual Rock Inscription), and never mentioning Buddhism, the Buddha or the Sangha.

However, Beckwith's theories are not accepted by mainstream scholarship: many of his methodologies and interpretations concerning early Buddhism, inscriptions, and archaeological sites have been criticized by other scholars, such as Johannes Bronkhorst and Osmund Bopearachchi. According to Patrick Olivelle, Beckwith's theory is "an outlier and no mainstream Ashokan scholar would subscribe to that view."

In the decades after the pillars were found scholars linked King Piyadisi to the King Ashoka, who had been widely praised in Buddhist legends. Another edict was discovered in 1915 and the name Ashoka was discovered, confirming the identification. The message of the edicts was directed toward certain government officials, but Asoka meant for the generalpopulation to know of them by eithe reading the inscriptions or through the teaching of dharma officers

=== List of Major Rock edicts ===
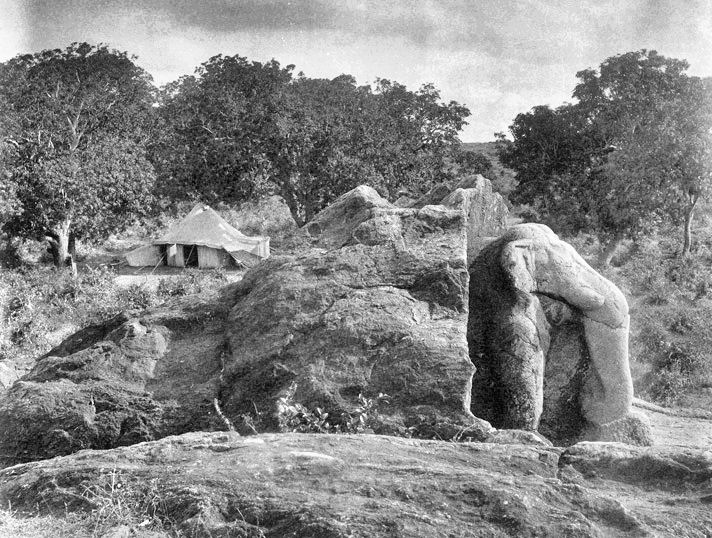
The Dhauli Major Rock Inscription of Ashoka. The front is shaped as an elephant. Dhauli, Khordha district of Odisha, India.

The major rock edicts of Ashoka include:

Rock Edict I
Prohibits animal slaughter. Bans festive gatherings and killings of animals. Only two peacocks and one deer were killed in Asoka’s kitchen. He wished to discontinue this practice of killing two peacocks and one deer as well.

Major Rock Edict II
Provides for care for man and animals, describes recipients as the Chola, Pandyas, Satyaputra and kerala putras Kingdoms of South India, and the Greek king Antiochus II and his neighbours.

Major Rock Edict III
Generosity to Brahmans. Issued after 12 years of Asoka’s coronation. It says that the Yuktas (subordinate officers) and Pradesikas (district Heads) along with Rajukas (Rural officers) shall go to the all areas of kingdom every five years and spread the Dhamma Policy of Asoka.

Major Rock Edict IV
Dhammaghosa is ideal to the mankind and not the Bherighosa. Impact of Dhamma on society.

Major Rock Edict V
Ashoka mentions in this rock edict "Every Human is my child". Appointment of Dhammamahamatras is mentioned in this edict.

Major Rock Edict VI
Describes King’s desire to get informed about the conditions of the people constantly. Talks about welfare measures. This shows Asoka's commitment to his people's affairs. He expressed the people should have access to their kind, even if he is on the toilet, and he should be ready to hear all urgent matters immediately.

Major Rock Edict VII
Requests tolerance for all religions - "To foster one’s own sect, depreciating the others out of affection for one’s own, to exalt its merit, is to do the worst harm to one’s own sect."

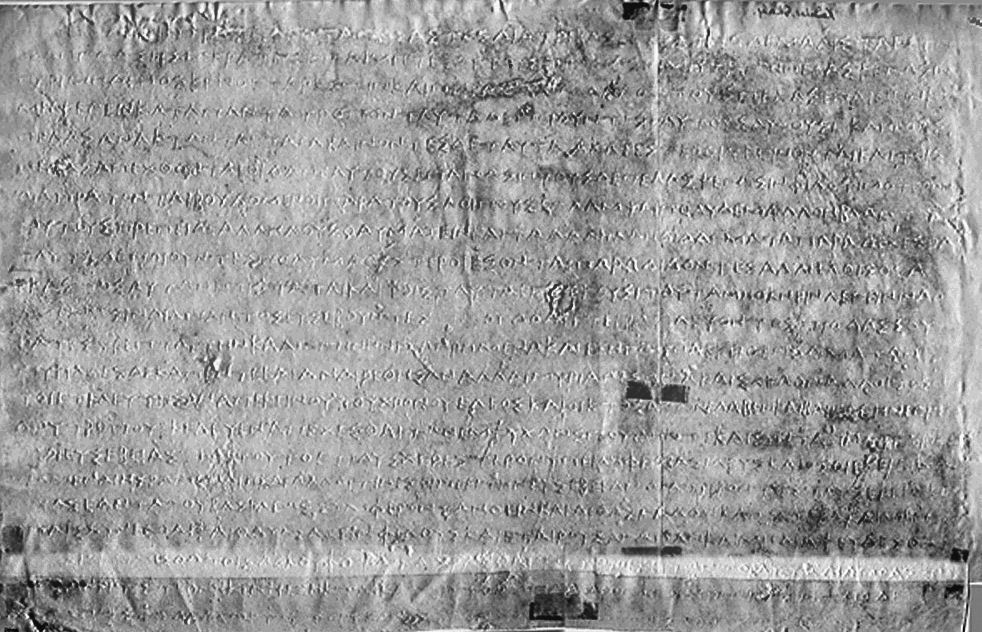
The Kandahar Greek Edict of Ashoka is a portion of a Major Rock Edict in Greek recovered in Kandahar, Afghanistan, in 1963.

Major Rock Edict VIII
Describes Asoka’s first Dhamma Yatra to Bodhgaya & Bodhi Tree.

Major Rock Edict IX
Condemns popular ceremonies. Stress in ceremonies of Dhamma.

Major Rock Edict X
Condemns the desire for fame and glory. Stresses on popularity of Dhamma.

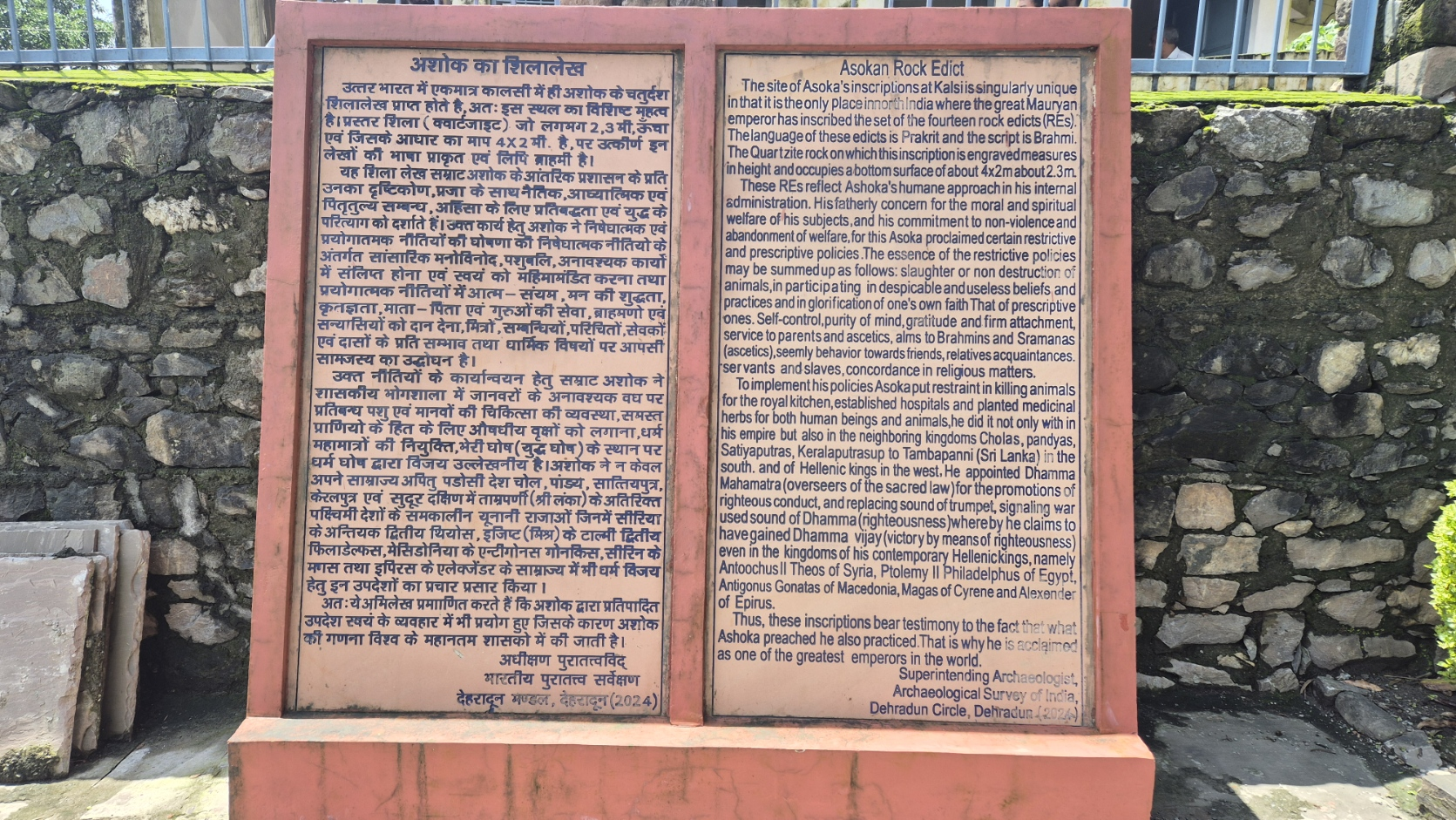
Ashokan Rock Edict at Kalsi, Uttarakhand

Major Rock Edict XI
Elaborates Dhamma Major

Rock Edict XII
Directed and determined request for tolerance among different religious sects.
Also written in Greek in the Kandahar Greek Edict of Ashoka (last portion)

Major Rock Edict XIII
It is the largest inscription from the edict. It talks about the Ashoka's (r.268 - 232 BC) victory over Kalinga (262 - 261 BC) and mentions his remorse for the half million killed or deported during his conquest, by "Dhamma". The edict asserts that in no land, except those of the Greeks, do not orders of Brahmans and Śramaṇa now exist to instruct on "Dhamma"; the forest tribes should repent or be killed; and he has conquered the lands, for 600 Yojana, to the borders of several named Greek rulers:
- Amtiyoga or Amtiyaka (𑀅𑀁𑀢𑀺𑀬𑀓), identified with Antiochus II Theos (r.261 - 246 BC) of the Seleucid Empire
- Tulamaya (𑀢𑀼𑀭𑀫𑀸𑀬), identified with Ptolemy III Euergetes of Egypt (r.246 - 222 BC)
- Antekina (𑀅𑀁𑀢𑁂𑀓𑀺𑀦), identified with Antigonus Gonatus of Macedonia (r.277 - 239 BC)
- Maka, identified with Magas of Cyrene (r.276 – 250 BC)
- Alikyashudala, possibly identified with Alexander II of Epirus (r.272 - 255 BC)
It also mentions the victory of Dhamma in south India among the Cholas and Pandyas, as far as Ceylon.
This edict was also written in Greek (probably together with all the other Major Rock Edicts I-XIV originally) in the Kandahar Greek Edict of Ashoka (first portion recovered). Sughandhi said the literal translation of this edict suggests the Mauryans execrcised some rule over this area, but Asoka does not reference such. This edict expresses his regret over conquering Kalinga during his eighth year, which led to his commitment to ruling by dharma.

Major Rock Edict XIV
Describes engraving of inscriptions in different parts of country. It inspires to live religious life.

=== Language of the Inscriptions ===
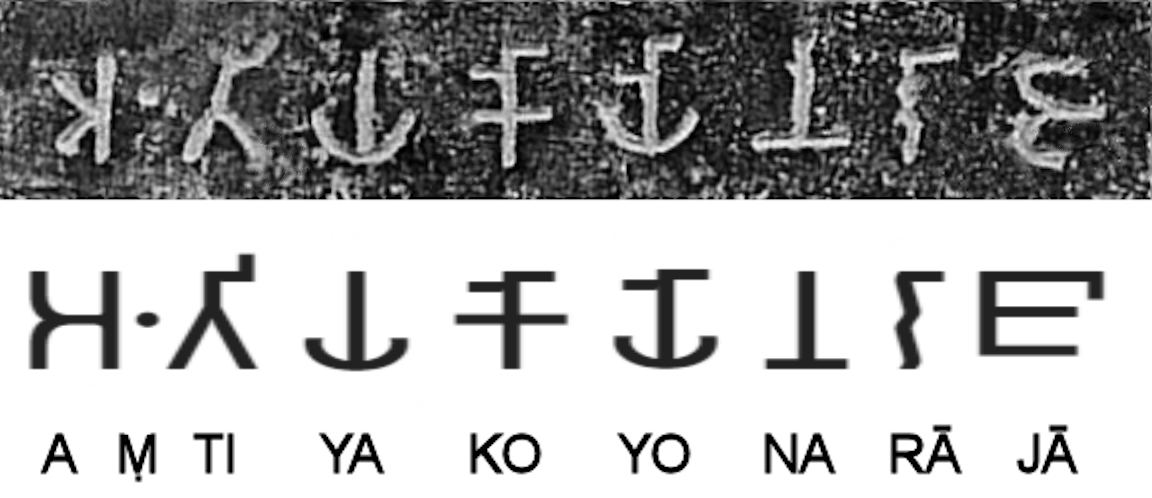
"Aṃtiyako Yona Rājā" (𑀅𑀁𑀢𑀺𑀬𑀓𑁄 𑀬𑁄𑀦 𑀭𑀸𑀚𑀸, "The Greek king Antiochos"), mentioned in Major Rock Edict No.2, here at Girnar, Gujarat, India. Brahmi script.

Three languages and four scripts were used. The edicts in the Indian language are composed in non-standardized and archaic forms of Prakrit. Prakrit inscriptions were written in Brahmi and Kharosthi scripts, which even a commoner could read and understand. The inscriptions found in Pakistan were written using the Kharosthi script. A few northern Edicts are written in Koine Greek, using a very standardized Greek alphabet, or in Middle Aramaic using an Aramaic script. The Kandahar Bilingual Rock Inscription is in Greek and Aramaic, but is often categorized as one of the Minor Rock Edicts. The Kandahar Greek Edicts of Ashoka is in Greek only and is likely to have originally contained Major Rock Edicts 1-14.

Ashoka's edicts are the first known inscriptions in India after the Indus Valley Civilisation fell.

=== Limited Buddhist character of the Major Rock Edicts ===
Several authors have pointed out that the Major Rock Edicts do not have a very strong Buddhist flavour, in particular compared to the Minor Rock Edicts. The subject of the Major Rock Edicts is the Dharma, which is essentially described as a corpus of moral and social values ("compassion, liberality, truthfulness, purity, gentleness, goodness, few sins, many virtuous deeds") and neither the Buddha, nor the Samgha, nor Buddhism are ever mentioned. The only likely mention of Buddhism only appears with the word "Sramanas" ("ascetics"), who are always mentioned next to "Brahmanas", in what appears as a rather neutral enumeration of the major religious actors of the period. In the 12th Major Rock Edict, Ashoka also claims to be honouring all sects.

In Major Rock Edict No.8 though, Ashoka unambiguously describes his pilgrimage to Sambodhi ( Saṃ+bodhi, “Complete Enlightenment”), another name of Bodh Gaya, the location of the Buddha's awakening. Ashoka also repeatedly condemns ceremonies and sacrifices, an apparent attack on Brahmanism. In the Major Rock Edicts Ashoka also expresses his belief in karma and rebirth, affirming that good deeds will be rewarded in this life and the next, in Heaven (𑀲𑁆𑀯𑀕 svaga).

Overall, according to Christopher I. Beckwith, the author of the Major Rock Edicts probably adhered to an "early, pietistic, popular" form of Buddhism.

== Description of the Major Rock Edicts ==
The Major Rock Edicts of Ashoka are inscribed on large rocks, except for the Kandahar version in Greek (Kandahar Greek Edict of Ashoka), written on a stone plaque belonging to a building. The Major Edicts are not located in the heartland of Mauryan territory, traditionally centered on Bihar, but on the frontiers of the territory controlled by Ashoka. All fourteen Major Edicts are found in Erragudi, along with Minor Rock Edicts I and II, while Edicts XII and XIV were also found at Sannati. hey also were placed at some distance from known settlements.

Major Rock Edicts of Ashoka
Name	Location and content	Map	Overview	Rock	Rubbing / Close-up
Kandahar	Main article: Kandahar Greek Edicts of Ashoka Old Kandahar, Afghanistan. End of Major Rock Edict 12 and beginning of Major Rock Edict 13 (in Greek). 31.602447°N 65.658843°E	Kandahar is located in South Asia			
Yerragudi	Gooty, near Guntakal, Anantapur, Andhra Pradesh. Major Rock Edicts 1-14. Minor Rock Edicts n°1 and n°2 are also present here . 15.209722°N 77.576944°E	Yerragudi is located in South Asia			
Girnar	Main article: Junagadh rock inscription of Rudradaman Girnar, Gujarat; Major Rock Edicts 1-14. Navigable 3D view 21.525075°N 70.479543°E	Girnar is located in South Asia			
Dhauli	The front is shaped as an elephant. Dhauli, Khordha district, Odisha. Major Rock Edicts 1-10, 14, Separate Edict 1 & Separate Edict 2. Navigable 3D view 20.1891573°N 85.8425935°E	Dhauli is located in South Asia			
Jaugada	Jaugada, Ganjam district, Odisha; Major Rock Edicts 1-10, 14, Separate Edicts 1&2. Navigable 3D view 19.522602°N 84.830885°E	Jaugada is located in South Asia			
Khalsi	Main article: Khalsi inscription Khalsi, Dehradun District, Uttarakhand. Major Rock Edicts 1 to 14. Navigable 3D view 30.5180°N 77.8482°E	Khalsi is located in South Asia			
Sopara	Nala Sopara, Mumbai Metropolitan Region, Palghar district, Maharashtra; Fragments of the 8th and 9th major rock edicts. Inscribed on a free-standing stone. 3D view 19.4141529°N 72.7950626°E	Soppara is located in South Asia			
Shahbazgarhi	Shahbazgarhi, Mardan, Pakistan; Major Rock Edicts 1 to 14 (in the Kharoshthi script). 34.223676°N 72.165541°E	Shahbazgarhi is located in South Asia			
Mansehra	Mansehra, Hazara, Pakistan; Major Rock Edicts 1 to 14 (in the Kharoshthi script). 34.337804°N 73.193420°E	Mansehra is located in South Asia			
Sannati	Sannati, Gulbarga, Karnataka; Major Rock Edicts 12, 14, separate edict replacing No.13. Originally set on a standing stone, inscribed front and back. Found (as building material) in Chandrala Parameswari Temple in Sannati. Now relocated 3 km away, near Kanaganahalli Stupa, where reliefs depicting Ashoka were found. 16.835024°N 76.9328908°E	Sannati is located in South Asia		An image	

== Content of the Edicts ==
There are altogether 14 Major Rocks Edicts, forming a group which is duplicated with only slight variations in 10 known locations, and two Separate Major Rock Edicts, in Dhauli and Jaugada.

=== Major Rock Edict 1 ===
Asoka’s prohibition of festivals and respect of animal life.

Major Rock Edict 1
English translation (Kalsi version)	Prakrit in Brahmi script
This rescript on morality has been caused to be written by Beloved of the Gods Priyadarsin. Here no living being must be killed and sacrificed. And also no festival meeting must be held. For King Beloved of the Gods Priyadarsin sees much evil in festival meetings. And there are also some festival meetings which are considered meritorious by king Devanampriya Priyadarsin. Formerly in the kitchen of King Beloved of the Gods Priyadarsin many hundred thousands of animals were killed daily for the sake of curry. But now, when this rescript on morality is caused to be written, then only three animals are being killed (daily), (viz.) two peacocks (and) one deer, but even this deer not regularly. But even these three animals shall not be killed (in future). — 1st Major Rock Edict. Translation by E. Hultzsch (1857-1927). Published in India in 1925. Inscriptions of Asoka p.27. Public Domain.	Major Rocks Edict 1 (Girnar)

=== Major Rock Edict 2 ===
Asoka’s providing of medical services, for human and animals, as well as herbs and fruit plants, to kings on his borders, including Hellenistic kings.

Major Rock Edict 2
English translation (Kalsi version)	Prakrit in Brahmi script
Aṃtiyoga Yona Rājā" ("The Greek king Antiochos"), namely Antiochus II, ruler of the Seleucid Empire, is mentioned in Major Rock Edict No.2, as a recipient of Ashoka's medical services. Everywhere in the dominions of King Beloved of the Gods Priyadarsin and (of those) who (are his) borderers, such as the Cholas, the Pandyas, the Satiyaputa, the Kelalaputa, Tamraparni, the Yona (Greek) king named Antiyoga (Antiochus), and the other kings who are the neighbours of this Antiyoga, everywhere two (kinds of) medical men were established by King Beloved of the Gods Priyadarsin, (viz.) medical treatment for men and medical treatment for cattle. Wherever there were no herbs beneficial to men and beneficial to cattle, everywhere they were caused to be imported and to be planted. Likewise, wherever there were no roots and fruits, everywhere they were caused to be imported and to be planted. On the roads trees were planted, and wells were caused to be dug for the use of cattle and men. — 2nd Major Rock Edict. Translation by E. Hultzsch (1857-1927). Published in India in 1925. Inscriptions of Asoka p.28. Public Domain.	Major Rock Edict 2 (Girnar)

=== Major Rock Edict 3 ===
Rules of morality and their implementation through Civil Servants.

Major Rock Edict 3
English translation (Kalsi version)	Prakrit in Brahmi script
King Beloved of the Gods Priyadarsin speaks thus. (When I had been) anointed twelve years, the following was ordered by me. Everywhere in my dominions the Yuktas, the Lajuka, (and) the Pradesika shall set out on a complete tour (throughout their charges) every five years for this very purpose, (viz.) for the following instruction in morality as well as for other business. Meritorious is obedience to mother and father. Liberality to friends, acquaintances, and relatives, and to Brahmanas and Sramanas is meritorious. Abstention from killing animals is meritorious. Moderation in expenditure (and) moderation in possessions are meritorious. And the councils (of Mahamatras) also shall order the Yuktas to register (these rules) both with (the addition of) reasons and according to the letter. — 3rd Major Rock Edict. Translation by E. Hultzsch (1857-1927). Published in India in 1925. Inscriptions of Asoka p.29. Public Domain.	Major Rock Edict 3 (Girnar)

=== Major Rock Edict 4 ===
Rules of morality.

Major Rock Edict 4
English translation (Kalsi version)	Prakrit in Brahmi script
In times past, for many hundreds of years, there had ever been promoted the killing of animals and the hurting of living beings, discourtesy to relatives, (and) discourtesy to Sramanas and Brahmanas. But now, in consequence of the practice of morality on the part of King Beloved of the Gods Priyadarsin, the sound of drums has become the sound of morality, showing the people representations of aerial chariots, elephants, masses of fire, and other divine figures. Such as they had not existed before for many hundreds of years, thus there are now promoted, through the instruction in morality on the part of king Beloved of the Gods Priyadarsin, abstention from killing animals, abstention from hurting living beings, courtesy to relatives, courtesy to Brahmanas and Sramanas, (and) obedience to mother and father. Both in this and in many other ways is the practice of morality promoted. And King Beloved of the Gods Priyadarsin will ever promote this practice of morality. And the sons, grandsons, and great-grandsons of King Beloved of the Gods Priyadarsin will ever promote this practice of morality until the aeon (of destruction of the world), (and) will instruct (people) in morality, abiding by morality and by good conduct For this is the best work, viz. instruction in morality. And the practice of morality also is not (possible) for (a person) devoid of good conduct. Therefore promotion and not neglect of this object is meritorious. For the following purpose has this been written, (viz. in order that) they should devote themselves to the promotion of this practice, and that they should not approve the neglect (of it). (This rescript) was caused to be written by King Beloved of the Gods Priyadarsin (when he had been) anointed twelve years. — 4th Major Rock Edict. Translation by E. Hultzsch (1857-1927). Published in India in 1925. Inscriptions of Asoka p.30. Public Domain.	Major Rock Edict 4 (Girnar)

=== Major Rock Edict 5 ===
Establishment and role of the Mahamatras.

Major Rock Edict 5
English translation (Kalsi version)	Prakrit in Brahmi script
King Beloved of the Gods Priyadarsin speaks (thus). It is difficult to perform virtuous deeds. He who starts performing virtuous deeds accomplishes something difficult. Now, by me many virtuous deeds have been performed. Therefore (among) my sons and grandsons, and (among) my descendants (who shall come) after them until the aeon (of destruction of the world), those who will conform to this (duty) will perform good deeds. But he who will neglect even a portion of this (duty) will perform evil deeds. For sin indeed steps fast. Now, in times past Mahamatras (officers) of morality did not exist before. Mahamatras of morality were appointed by me (when I had been) anointed thirteen years. These are occupied with all sects in establishing morality, in promoting morality, and for the welfare and happiness of those who are devoted to morality (even) among the Greeks, Kambojas, and Gandharas, and whatever other western borderers (of mine there are). They are occupied with servants and masters, with Brahmanas and Ibhiyas, with the destitute; (and) with the aged, for the welfare and happiness of those who are devoted to morality, (and) in releasing (them) from the fetters (of worldly life). They are occupied in supporting prisoners (with money), in causing (their) fetters to be taken off, and in setting (them) free, if one has children, or is bewitched, or aged, respectively. They are occupied everywhere, here and in all the outlying towns, in the harems of our brothers, of (our) sisters, and (of) whatever other relatives (of ours there are). These Mahamatras of morality are occupied everywhere in my dominions with those who are devoted to morality, (in order to ascertain) whether one is eager for morality or properly devoted to charity. For the following purpose has this rescript on morality been caused to be written, (viz. that) it may be of long duration, and (that) my descendants may conform to it. — 5th Major Rock Edict. Translation by E. Hultzsch (1857-1927). Published in India in 1925. Inscriptions of Asoka p.32. Public Domain.	Major Rock Edict No5 (Girnar) The expression Dhaṃma Mahāmātā (variously translated "Inspectors of the Dharma" or "Mahamatas of morality") in Major Rock Edict No.5 at Girnar.

=== Major Rock Edict 6 ===
Ashoka' management of government affairs.

Major Rock Edict 6
English translation (Kalsi version)	Prakrit in Brahmi script
King Beloved of the Gods Priyadarsin speaks thus. In times past neither the disposal of affairs nor the submission of reports at any time did exist before. But I have made the following (arrangement). Reporters have to report to me the affairs of the people at any time (and) anywhere, while I am eating, in the harem, in the inner apartment, at the cowpen, in the palanquin, (and) in the park. And everywhere I shall dispose of the affairs of the people. And also, if in the council (of Mahamatras) a dispute arises, or an amendment is moved, in connection with any donation or proclamation which I am ordering verbally, or (in connection with) an emergent matter which has been delegated to the Mahamatras, it must be reported to me immediately, anywhere, (and) at any time. Thus I have ordered. For I am never content in exerting myself and in dispatching business. For I consider it my duty (to promote) the welfare of all men. But the root of that (is) this, (viz,) exertion and the dispatch of business. For no duty is more important than (promoting) the welfare of all men. And whatever effort I am making, (is made) in order that I may discharge the debt (which I owe) to living beings, (that) I may make them happy in this (world), and (that) they may attain heaven in the other (world). Now, for the following purpose has this rescript on morality been caused to be written, (viz, that) it may be of long duration, and (that) my sons and wives may display the same zeal for the welfare of all men. But it is difficult to accomplish this without great zeal. — 6th Major Rock Edict. Translation by E. Hultzsch (1857-1927). Published in India in 1925. Inscriptions of Asoka p.34. Public Domain.	Major Rock Edict No6 (Girnar)

=== Major Rock Edict 7 ===
The importance of self-control, purity of mind, gratitude, and firm devotion.

Major Rock Edict 7
English translation (Kalsi version)	Prakrit in Brahmi script
King Beloved of the Gods Priyadarsin desires (that) all sects may reside everywhere. For all these desire self-control and purity of mind. But men possess various desires (and) various passions. They will fulfil (either) the whole (or) only a portion (of their duties). But even one who (practises) great liberality, (but) does not possess self-control, purity of mind, gratitude, and firm devotion, is very mean. — 7th Major Rock Edict. Translation by E. Hultzsch (1857-1927). Published in India in 1925. Inscriptions of Asoka p.34. Public Domain.	Major Rock Edict No7 (Girnar)

=== Major Rock Edict 8 ===
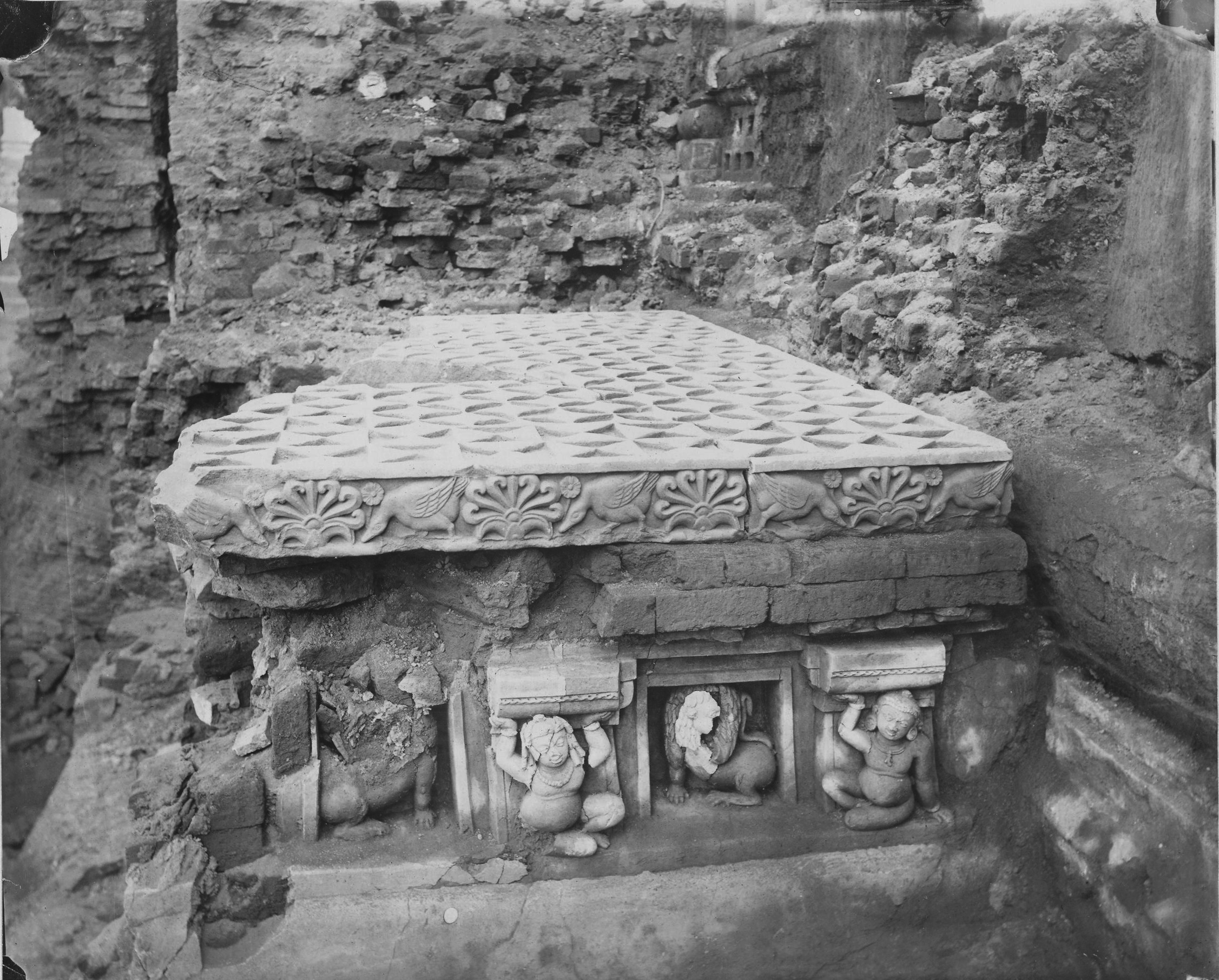
The Diamond Throne built by Ashoka in Bodh Gaya.

Morality tours by Ashoka.

This Edict is remarkable in that it describes the visit of the king to Sambodhi ( Saṃ+bodhi, “Complete Enlightenment”), another name of Bodh Gaya. It is thought that Ashoka built in Bodh Gaya the Diamond Throne, in order to mark the place where the Buddha reached enlightenment.

According to tradition, Ashoka was profoundly grieved when he discovered that the sacred pipal tree was not properly being taken care of and dying out due to the neglect of Queen Tiṣyarakṣitā. As a consequence, Ashoka endeavoured to take care of the Bodhi Tree, and built a temple around it. This temple became the center of Bodh Gaya. A sculpture at Sanchi, southern gateway of Stupa No1, shows Ashoka in grief being supported by his two Queens. Then the relief above shows the Bodhi Tree prospering inside its new temple. Numerous other sculptures at Sanchi show scenes of devotion towards the Bodhi Tree, and the Bodhi Tree inside its temple at Bodh Gaya.

The Kalsi version also uses the title "Devanampriyas" to describe previous kings (whereas the other versions use the term "Kings"), suggesting that the title "Denampriya" had a rather wide usage and might just have meant "King".

Major Rock Edict 8
English translation (Kalsi version)	Prakrit in Brahmi script
Ashoka went to Bodh Gaya ("Sambodhi") in the 11th year of his reign. Sanchi relief of the Bodhi tree. In times past the Beloved of the Godss (Kings) used to set out on so-called pleasure-tours. On these (tours) hunting and other such pleasures were (enjoyed). When king Beloved of the Gods Priyadarsin had been anointed ten years, he went out to Sambodhi. Therefore tours of morality (were undertaken) here. On these (tours) the following takes place, (viz.) visiting Sramanas and Brahmanas and making gifts (to them), visiting the aged and supporting (them) with gold, visiting the people of the country, instructing (them) in morality, and questioning (them) about morality, as suitable for this (occasion). This second period (of the reign) of King Beloved of the Gods Priyadarsin becomes a pleasure in a higher degree. — 8th Major Rock Edict. Translation by E. Hultzsch (1857-1927). Published in India in 1925. Inscriptions of Asoka p.36-37. Public Domain.	Major Rock Edict No8 (Girnar) The word Bodhi ("Enlightenment") first appears in Major Rock Edict No.8.

=== Major Rock Edict 9 ===
Morality rather than ceremonies.

Major Rock Edict 9
English translation (Kalsi version)	Prakrit in Brahmi script
King Beloved of the Gods Priyadarsin speaks (thus). Men are practising various ceremonies during illness, at the marriage of a son or a daughter, at the birth of a child, (and) when setting out on a journey; on these and other such (occasions) men are practising many ceremonies. But in such (cases) mothers and wives are practising many and various vulgar and useless ceremonies. Now, ceremonies should certainly be practised. But these (ceremonies) bear little fruit indeed. But the following bears much fruit indeed, viz. the practice of morality. Herein the following (are comprised), (viz.) proper courtesy to slaves and servants, reverence to elders, gentleness to animals, (and) liberality to Sramanas and Brahmanas; these and other such (virtues) are called the practice of morality. Therefore a father, or a son, or a brother, or a master, (or) a friend or an acquaintance, or even a (mere) neighbour ought to say : "This is meritorious. This practice should be observed until the (desired) object is attained, (thinking): "I shall observe this". For other a ceremonies are of doubtful (effect). One may attain his object (by them), but he may not (do so). And they (bear fruit) in this world only. But that practice of morality is not restricted to time. Even if one does not attain (by it) his object in this (world), then endless merit is produced in the other (world). But if one attains (by it) his object in this (world), the gain of both (results) arises from it; (viz.) the (desired) object (is attained) in this (world), and endless merit is produced in the other (world) by that practice of morality. — 9th Major Rock Edict. Translation by E. Hultzsch (1857-1927). Published in India in 1925. Inscriptions of Asoka p.34. Public Domain.	Major Rock Edict No9 (Girnar)

=== Major Rock Edict 10 ===
Strive for merit.

Major Rock Edict 10
English translation (Kalsi version)	Prakrit in Brahmi script
King Beloved of the Gods Priyadarsin does not think that either glory or fame conveys much advantage, except whatever glory or fame he desires (on account of his aim) that in the present time, and in the future, men may (be induced) by him to practise obedience to morality, or that they may conform to the duties of morality. On this (account) King Beloved of the Gods Priyadarsin is desiring glory and fame. And whatever effort King Beloved of the Gods Priyadarsin is making, all that (is) only for the sake of (merit) in the other (world), (and) in order that all (men) may run little danger. But the danger is this, viz. demerit. But it is indeed difficult either for a lowly person or for a high one to accomplish this without great zeal (and without) laying aside every (other aim). But among these (two) it is indeed (more) difficult to accomplish just for a high (person). — 10th Major Rock Edict. Translation by E. Hultzsch (1857-1927). Published in India in 1925. Inscriptions of Asoka p.34. Public Domain.	Major Rock Edict No10 (Girnar)

=== Major Rock Edict 11 ===
Morality, courtesy, meritorious deeds.

Major Rock Edict 11
English translation (Kalsi version)	Prakrit in Brahmi script
King Beloved of the Gods Priyadarsin speaks thus, There is no such gift as the gift of morality, the distribution of morality, (and) kinship through morality (Dhamma Niti). Herein the following (are comprised), (viz.) proper courtesy to slaves and servants, obedience to mother and father, liberality to friends, acquaintances, and relatives, to Sramanas and Brahmanas, (and) abstention from killing animals. Concerning this a father, or a son, or a brother, or a master, (or) a friend or an acquaintance, (or) even a (mere) neighbour, ought to say "This is meritorious. This ought to be done". If one is acting thus, (happiness) in this world is attained, and endless merit is produced in the other (world) by that gift of morality. — 11th Major Rock Edict. Translation by E. Hultzsch (1857-1927). Published in India in 1925. Inscriptions of Asoka p.34. Public Domain.	Major Rock Edict No11 (Girnar)

=== Major Rock Edict 12 ===
Respect other sects and not take pride in one's own.

Major Rock Edict 12
English translation (Kalsi version)	Prakrit in Brahmi script
King Beloved of the Gods Priyadarsin is honouring all sects: ascetics or house holders, with gifts and with honours of various kinds. But Beloved of the Gods does not value either gifts or honours so (highly) as (this), (viz.) that a promotion of the essentials of all sects should take place. This promotion of the essentials (is possible) in many ways. But its root is this, viz. guarding (one's) speech, (i.e.) that neither praising one's own sect nor blaming other sects should take place on improper occasions, or (that) it should be moderate in every case. But other sects ought to be honoured in every way. If one is acting thus, he is promoting his own sect considerably and is benefiting other sects as well. If one is acting otherwise than thus, he is both hurting his own sect and wronging other sects as well. For whosoever praises his own sect or blames other sects, — all (this) out of pure devotion to his own sect, (i.e.) with the view of glorifying his own sect, — if he is acting thus, he rather injures his own sect very severely. But concord is meritorious, (i.e.) that they should both hear and obey each other's morals. For this is the desire of Beloved of the Gods, (viz.) that all sects should be both full of learning and pure in doctrine. And those who are attached to their respective (sects), ought to be spoken to (as follows). Beloved of the Gods does not value either gifts or honours so (highly) as (this), (viz.) that a promotion of the essentials of all sects should take place. And many (officers) are occupied for this purpose, (viz.) the Mahamatras of morality, the Mahamatras controlling women, the inspectors of cowpens, or other classes (of officials). And this is the fruit of it, (viz,) that both the promotion of one's own sect takes place, and the glorification of morality. — 12th Major Rock Edict. Translation by E. Hultzsch (1857-1927). Published in India in 1925. Inscriptions of Asoka p.34. Public Domain.	Major Rock Edict No12 (Girnar)

=== Major Rock Edict 13 ===
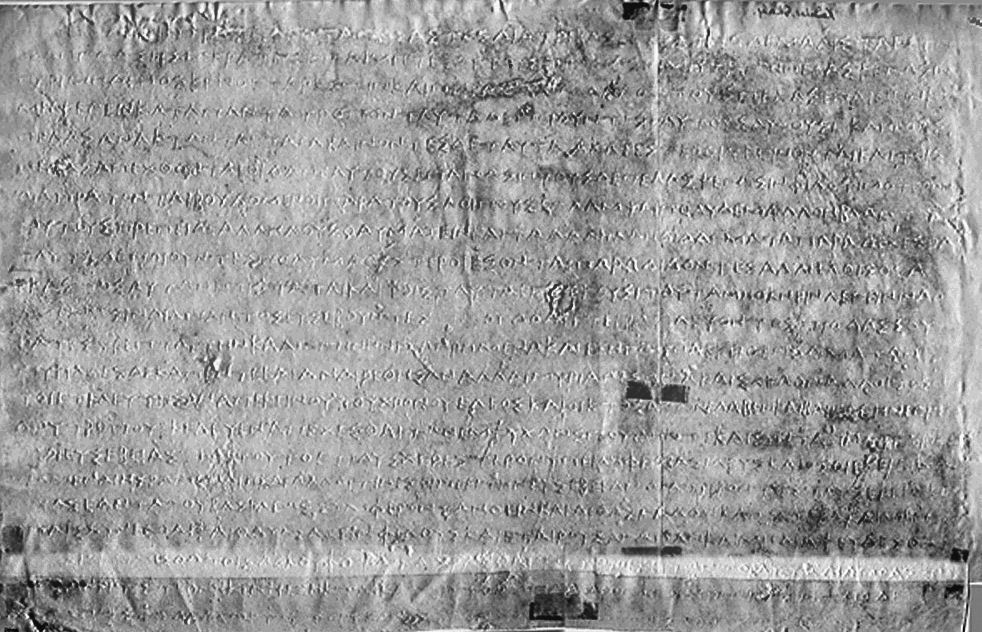
A Greek translation of Edicts 13 and 14, the Kandahar Greek Edict of Ashoka, was also discovered in Kandahar, Afghanistan.

Content: Ashoka’s victory in the Kalinga war followed by remorse. Victory of morality in India and among the Greeks (Yonas), as far as where the Greek kings Antiochus, Ptolemy, Antigonus, Magas and Alexander rule.

The kings mentioned in Edict 13 as following the Dharma have been identified with the major Hellenistic rulers of the period:

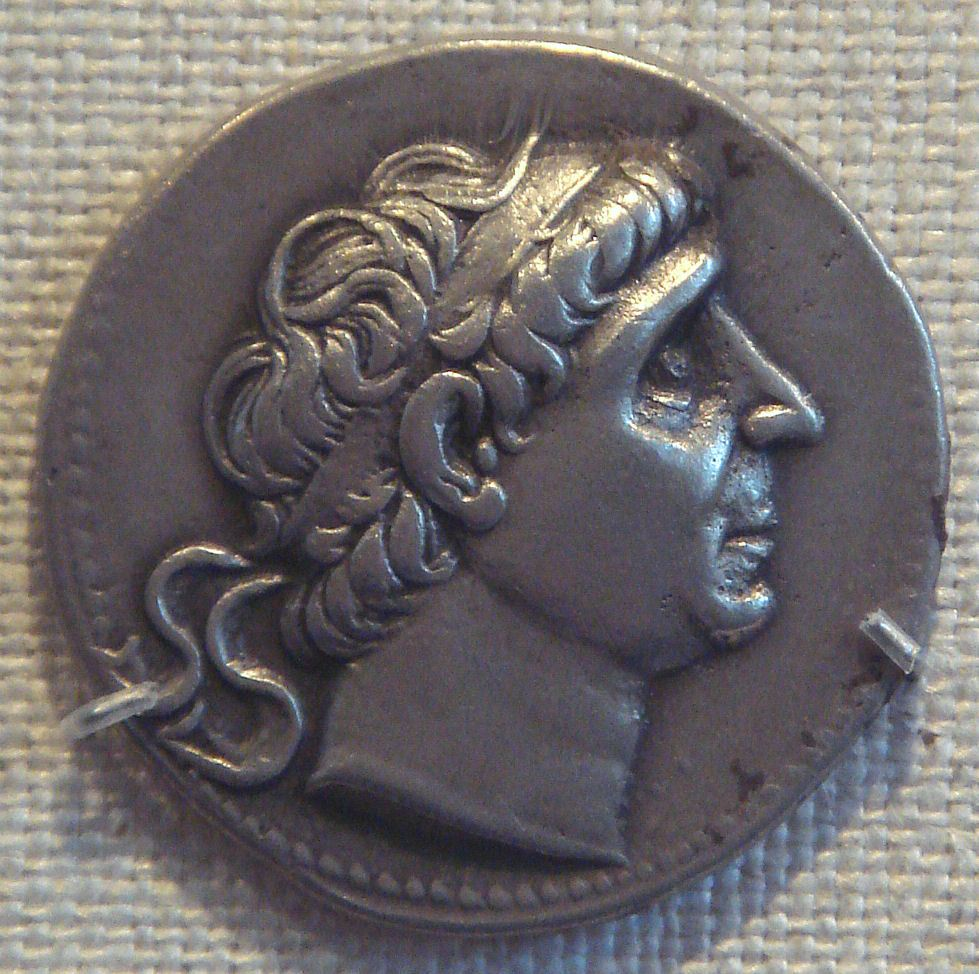
Seleucid king Antiochus II Theos (261-246 av.J-C).

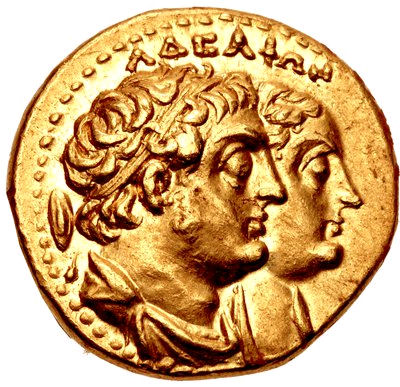
King of Egypt Ptolemy II and his sister Arsinoe II.

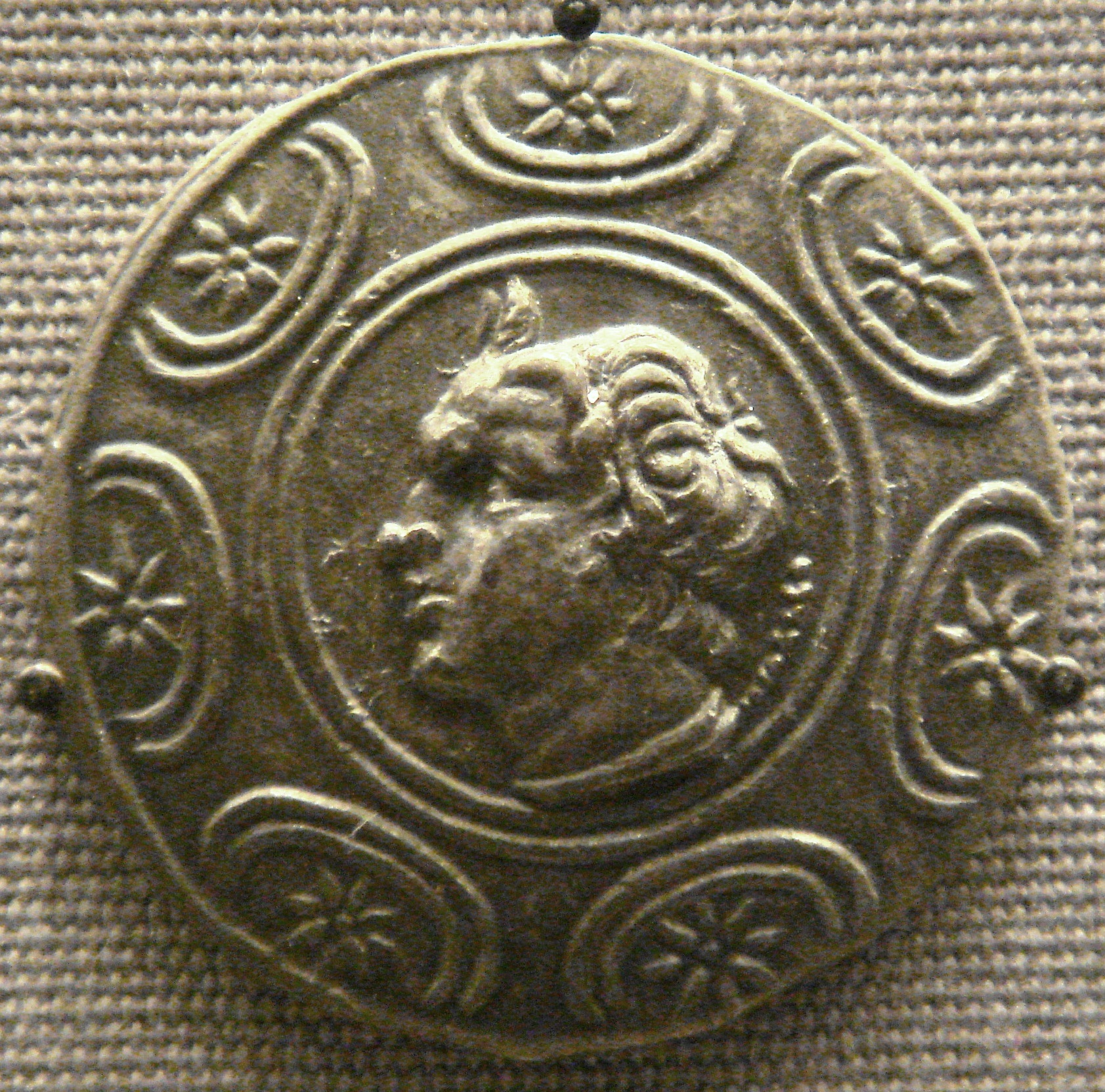
Antigonus II Gonatas.

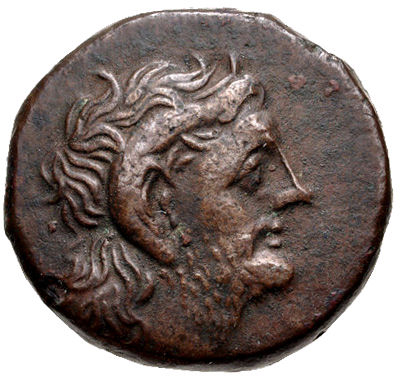
Magas, king of Cyrene

Major Rock Edict 13
English translation (Kalsi version)	Prakrit in Brahmi script
Ashoka conquered Kalinga in the 8th year of his reign. When King Beloved of the Gods Priyadarsin had been anointed eight years, (the country of) the Kalingans was conquered by (him). One hundred and fifty thousand in number were the men who were deported thence, one hundred thousand in number were those who were slain there, and many times as many those who died. After that, now that (the country of) the Kalingyas has been taken, Beloved of the Gods (is devoted) to a zealous study of morality, to the love of morality, and to the instruction (of people) in morality. This is the repentance of Beloved of the Gods on account of his conquest of (the country of) the Kalingyas. For, this is considered very painful and deplorable by Beloved of the Gods, that, while one is conquering an unconquered (country), slaughter, death, and deportation of people (are taking place) there, But the following is considered even more deplorable than this by Beloved of the Gods. (To) the Brahmanas or Sramanas, or other sects or householders/who are living there, (and) among whom the following are practised: obedience to those who receive high pay, obedience to mother and father, obedience to elders, proper courtesy to friends, acquaintances, companions, and relatives, to slaves and servants, (and) firm devotion, to these then happen injury or slaughter or deportation of (their) beloved ones. Or if there are then incurring misfortune the friends, acquaintances, companions, and relatives of those whose affection (for the latter) is undiminished, although they are (themselves) well provided for, this (misfortune) as well becomes an injury to those (persons) themselves. This is shared by all men and is considered deplorable by Beloved of the Gods. There is no country where these (two) classes, (viz.) the Brahmanas and the Sramanas, do not exist, except among the Greeks; and there is no (place) in any country where men are not indeed attached to some sect. Therefore even the hundredth part or the thousandth part of all those people who were slain, who died, and who were deported at that time when (the country of) the Kalingans was taken, (would) now be considered very deplorable by Beloved of the Gods........desires towards all beings ..... self-control, impartiality, (and) kindness. But this by Beloved of the Gods, viz, the conquest by morality. According to Ashoka in Edict 13, the Dharma now triumphs from south India to the Hellenistic Mediterranean. And this (conquest) has been won repeatedly by Beloved of the Gods both [here] and among all (his) borderers, even as far as at (the distance of) six hundred yojanas where the Yona king named Antiyoga (is ruling), and beyond this Antiyoga, (where) four kings (are ruling), (viz, the king) named Tulamaya, (the king) named Antekina, (the king) named Maka, (and the king) named Alikyashudala, (and) likewise towards the south, (where) the Chodas and Pandyas (are ruling), as far as Tamraparni. Likewise here in the king's territory, among the Greeks (Yonas) and Kambojas, among the Nabhakas and Nabhapanktis, among the Bhojas and Pitinikyas, among the Andhras and Pulindas, everywhere (people) are conforming to Beloved of the Gods's instruction in morality. Even those to whom the envoys of Beloved of the Gods do not go, having heard of the duties of morality, the ordinances, (and) the instruction in morality of Beloved of the Gods, are conforming to morality and will conform to (it). This conquest, which has been won by this everywhere; causes the feeling of satisfaction. Firm becomes this satisfaction, (viz.) the satisfaction at the conquest by morality. But this satisfaction is indeed of little (consequence). Beloved of the Gods thinks that only the fruits in the other (world) are of great (value). And for the following purpose has this rescript on morality been written, (viz,) in order that the sons (and) great-grandsons (who) may be (born) to me, should not think that a fresh conquest ought to be made; (that), if a conquest does please them, they should take pleasure in mercy and light punishments; and (that) they should regard the conquest by morality as the only (true) conquest. This (conquest bears fruit) in this world (and) in the other world. And let all (their) pleasure be the pleasure in exertion. For this (bears fruit) in this world (and) in the other world. — 13th Major Rock Edict. Translation by E. Hultzsch (1857-1927). Published in India in 1925. Inscriptions of Asoka p.43. Public Domain.	Major Rock Edict 13 at Khalsi, with highlighted names of the Greek kings Antiochus, Ptolemy, Antigonus, Magas and Alexander.

=== Major Rock Edict 14 ===
Objectives and modalities of inscriptions.

Major Rock Edict 14
English translation (Kalsi version)	Prakrit in Brahmi script
These rescripts on morality have been caused to be written by king Beloved of the Gods Priyadarsin either in an abridged (form), or of middle (size), or at full length, For the whole was not suitable everywhere. For (my) dominions are wide, and much has been written, and I shall constantly cause still (more) to be written. And (some) of this has been stated again and again because of the charm of certain topics, (and) in order that men should act accordingly. But some of this may have been written incompletely, either on account of the locality, or because (my) motive was not liked, or by the fault of the writer. — 14th Major Rock Edict. Translation by E. Hultzsch (1857-1927). Published in India in 1925. Inscriptions of Asoka p.49. Public Domain.	Major Rock Edict No14 (Girnar).

=== First Separate Major Rock Edict ===
In Dhauli and Jaugada, on the east coast of India, in the recently conquered territory of Kalinga, Major Rock Edicts 11 to 13 were omitted from the normal complement of Edicts from 1 to 14, but two separate Edicts were put in their place. The First Separate Major Rock Edicts mainly addresses local officials (from Tosali in the Dhauli Separate Edicts and from Somāpā in the Jaugada versions) referring to the requirements of a fair judicial system, and the system of control established by Ashoka through the Mahamatras, sent from Pataliputra, Ujjain and Taxila.

Chronologically, it seems that the First Separate Rock Edict was actually engraved after the Second Separate Rock Edict. The first and second separate edicts seem to have been inscribed at about the same time as the other Major Rock Edicts, in the 13th and 14th years of Ashoka's reign.

First Separate Major Rock Edict
English translation (Dhauli version)	Prakrit in Brahmi script
At the word of the Beloved of the Gods, the Mahamatras at Tosali, (who are) the judicial officers of the city, have to be told (thus). Whatever I recognize (to be right), that I strive to carry out by deeds, and to accomplish by (various) means. And this is considered by me the principal means for this object, viz. (to give) instruction to you. For you are occupied with many thousands of men, with the object of gaining the affection of men. All men are my children. As on behalf of (my own) children I desire that they may be provided with complete welfare and happiness in this world and in the other world, the same I desire also on behalf of [all] men.And you do not learn ? how far this (my) object reaches. Some single person only learns this, (and) even he (only) a portion, (but) not the whole. Now you must pay attention to this, although you are well provided for. It happens in the administration (of justice) that a single person suffers either imprisonment or harsh treatment. In this case (an order) cancelling the imprisonment is (obtained) by him accidentally, while [many] other people continue to suffer. In this case you must strive to deal (with all of them) impartially. But one fails to act (thus) on account of the following dispositions: envy, anger, cruelty, hurry, want of practice, laziness, (and) fatigue. (You) must strive for this, that these dispositions may not arise to you. And the root of all this is the absence of anger and the avoidance of hurry. He who is fatigued in the administration (of justice), will not rise; but one ought to move, to walk, and to advance. He who will pay attention to this, must tell you: "See that (you) discharge the debt (which you owe to the king); such and such is the instruction of the Beloved of the Gods". The observance of this produces great fruit, (but its) non-observance (becomes) a great evil. For if one fails to observe this, there will be neither attainment of heaven nor satisfaction of the king. For how (could) my mind be pleased if one badly fulfils this duty? But if (you) observe this, you will attain heaven, and you will discharge the debt (which you owe) to me. And this edict must be listened to (by all) on (every day of) the constellation. And it may be listened to even by a single (person) also on frequent (other) occasions between (the days of) Tishya. And if (you) act thus, you will be able to fulfil (this duty). For the following purpose has this rescript been written here, (viz.) in order that the judicial officers of the city may strive at all times (for this), [that] neither undeserved fettering nor undeserved harsh treatment are happening to [men]. And for the following purpose I shall send out every five years a Mahamatra who will be neither harsh nor fierce, (but) of gentle actions, (viz. in order to ascertain) whether (the judicial officers), paying attention to this object, are acting thus, as my instruction (implies). But from Ujjayini also the ruling prince will send out for the same purpose a person of the same description, and he will not allow (more than) three years to pass (without such a deputation). In the same way (an officer will be deputed) from Takhasila also. When these Mahamatras will set out on tour, then, without neglecting their own duties, they will ascertain this as well, (viz.) whether (the judicial officers) are carrying out this also thus, as the instruction of the king (implies). — First Separate Rock Edict (Dhauli version). Translation by E. Hultzsch (1857-1927). Published in India in 1925. Inscriptions of Asoka p.95. Public Domain.	First Separate Rock Edict (Dhauli version).

=== Second Separate Major Rock Edict ===
In Dhauli and Jaugada, on the east coast of India, in the recently conquered territory of Kalinga, Major Rock Edicts 11 to 13 were omitted, but another separate Edict was put in their place, the Second Separate Major Rock Edict, addressed to the officials of Tosali in the Dhauli Separate Edicts and of Somāpā in the Jaugada versions. The Second Separate Edict asks the local officials to try to convince "unconquered bordering tribes" that the intentions of Ashoka towards them are benevolent.

Second Separate Major Rock Edict
English translation (Dhauli version)	Prakrit in Brahmi script
At the word of Beloved of the Gods, the ruling prince and the Mahamatras at Tosali have to be told (thus). Whatever I recognize (to be right), that, and to accomplish by (various) means... As on behalf of (my own) children I desire that they may be provided with complete welfare and happiness in this world and in the other world, thus . . It might occur to (my) unconquered borderers (to ask): What does the king desire with reference to us? [This] alone is my wish with reference to the borderers, that they may learn that Beloved of the Gods..., that they may not be afraid of me, but may have confidence (in me); that they may obtain only happiness from me/ not misery; that they may [learn] this, that Beloved of the Gods - will forgive them what can be forgiven; that they may (be induced) by me (to) practise morality; (and) that they may attain (happiness in) this world and (in) the other world. ... For the following purpose I am instructing you, (viz. that) I may discharge the debt (which I owe to them) by this, that I instruct (you) and inform (you) of (my) will, my unshakable resolution and vow. Therefore, acting thus, (you) must fulfil (your) duty and must inspire confidence to them, in order that they may learn that Beloved of the Gods is to them like a father, that Beloved of the Gods loves them like himself, and that they are to the Beloved of the Gods like (his own) children. Therefore, having instructed (you), and having informed you of (my) will, I shall have (i. e, entertain) officers in (all) provinces for this object. For you are able to inspire confidence to those (borderers) and (to secure their) welfare and happiness in this world and in the other world. And if (you) act thus, you will attain heaven, and will discharge the debt (which you owe) to me. And for the following purpose has this rescript been written here, (viz,) in order that the Mahamatras may strive at all times to inspire confidence to those borderers (of mine) and (to induce them) to practice morality, And this rescript must be listened to (by all) every four months on (the day of) the constellation Tishya. But if desired, it may be listened to even by a single (person) also on frequent (other) occasions between (the days of) Tishya. If (you) act thus, you will be able to carry out (my orders). — Second Separate Rock Edict (Dhauli version). Translation by E. Hultzsch (1857-1927). Published in India in 1925. Inscriptions of Asoka p.99. Public Domain.	Second Separate Rock Edict (Dhauli version).

== See also ==
- Related topics
  - Ancient iron production
  - Dhar iron pillar
  - History of metallurgy in South Asia
  - Iron pillar of Delhi
  - List of Edicts of Ashoka
  - Pillars of Ashoka
  - Stambha
- Other similar topics
  - Early Indian epigraphy
  - Hindu temple architecture
  - History of India
  - Indian copper plate inscriptions
  - Indian rock-cut architecture
  - List of rock-cut temples in India
  - Outline of ancient India
  - South Indian Inscriptions
  - Tagundaing
