= Jaugada =

Ruined fortress in Odisha, India

Coordinates: 19.522602°N 84.830885°E

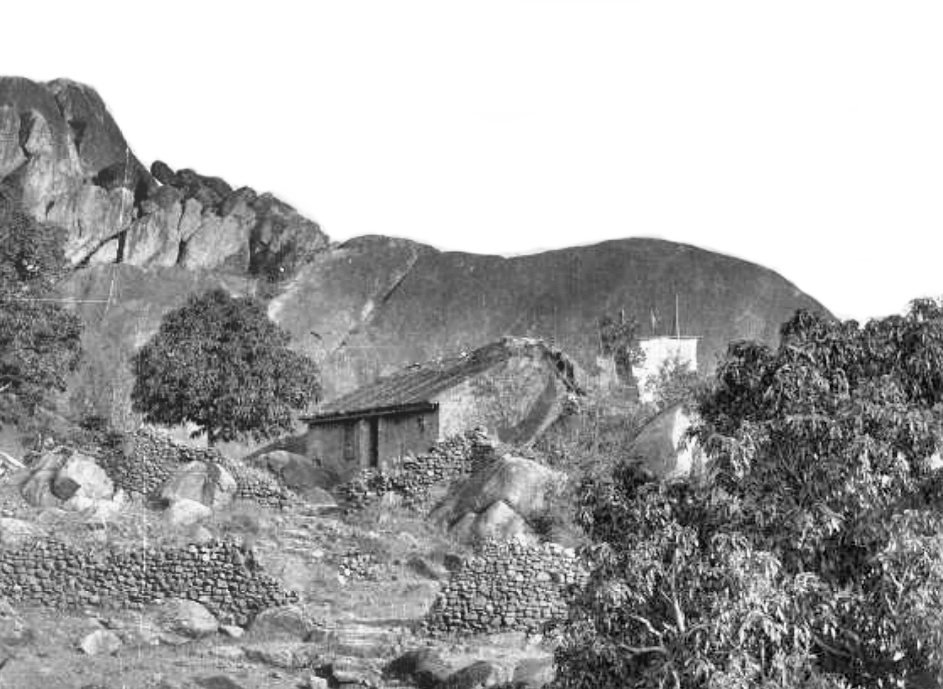
Large rock with Ashoka inscriptions (behind the house) at Jaugada in 1895

Plan of the ancient settlement

Jaugada ("Jaugarh", ancient Samapa) is a ruined fortress in the Ganjam district in Odisha, India. Jaugada lies 35 km north-west of Brahmapur and 160 km south-west of Bhubaneshwar. Once a provincial Mauryan fortified capital of the newly conquered province of Kalinga, Jaugada is famous for its version of the monumental stone-cut edicts in Prakrit of the Mauryan emperor Ashoka.

Despite J.D. Beglar's description during the later 19th century of the extant fortification towers and moat ("The walls had towers, also of earth, at each of the four corners, and also on each flank of each of the eight entrances"), without photos and drawings, the remains are difficult to visualize and comprehend. In 1956 Debala Mitra of the Archaeological Survey of India transected the northern glacis with a trench. The now collapsed trench of this investigation appears to lie just east of the eastern gate of the north wall. It is near the great Shiva temple Kaleswar & Rameswar (which is known as a temple where Shiva and Vishnu are seen together).

This site was first documented in 2001 by a team from the University of Heidelberg.

Edicts of Ashoka

Jaugada is the location of some of the Major Rock Edicts of Ashoka, inscribed circa 250 BCE: Major Rock Edicts 1-10 and 14 are inscribed on a central rock in the compound, as well as Separate Edicts 1&2. This configuration is similar to that of the nearby Dhauli Edicts of Ashoka (250 km to the northeast).

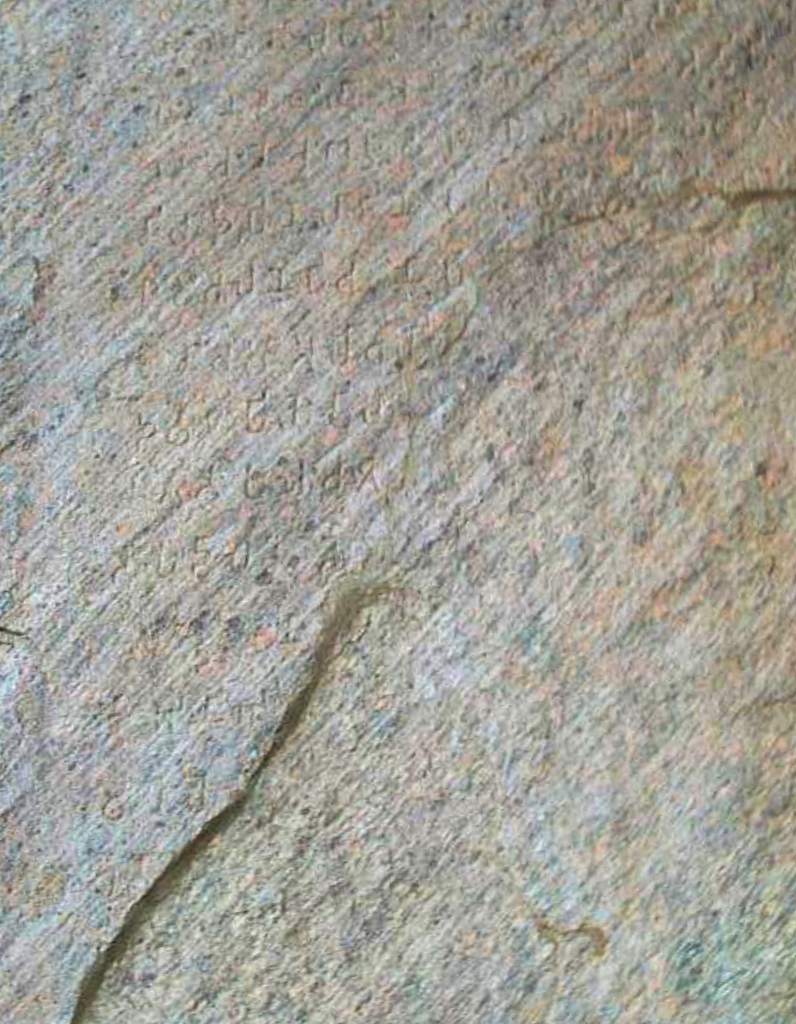
Ashokan inscription

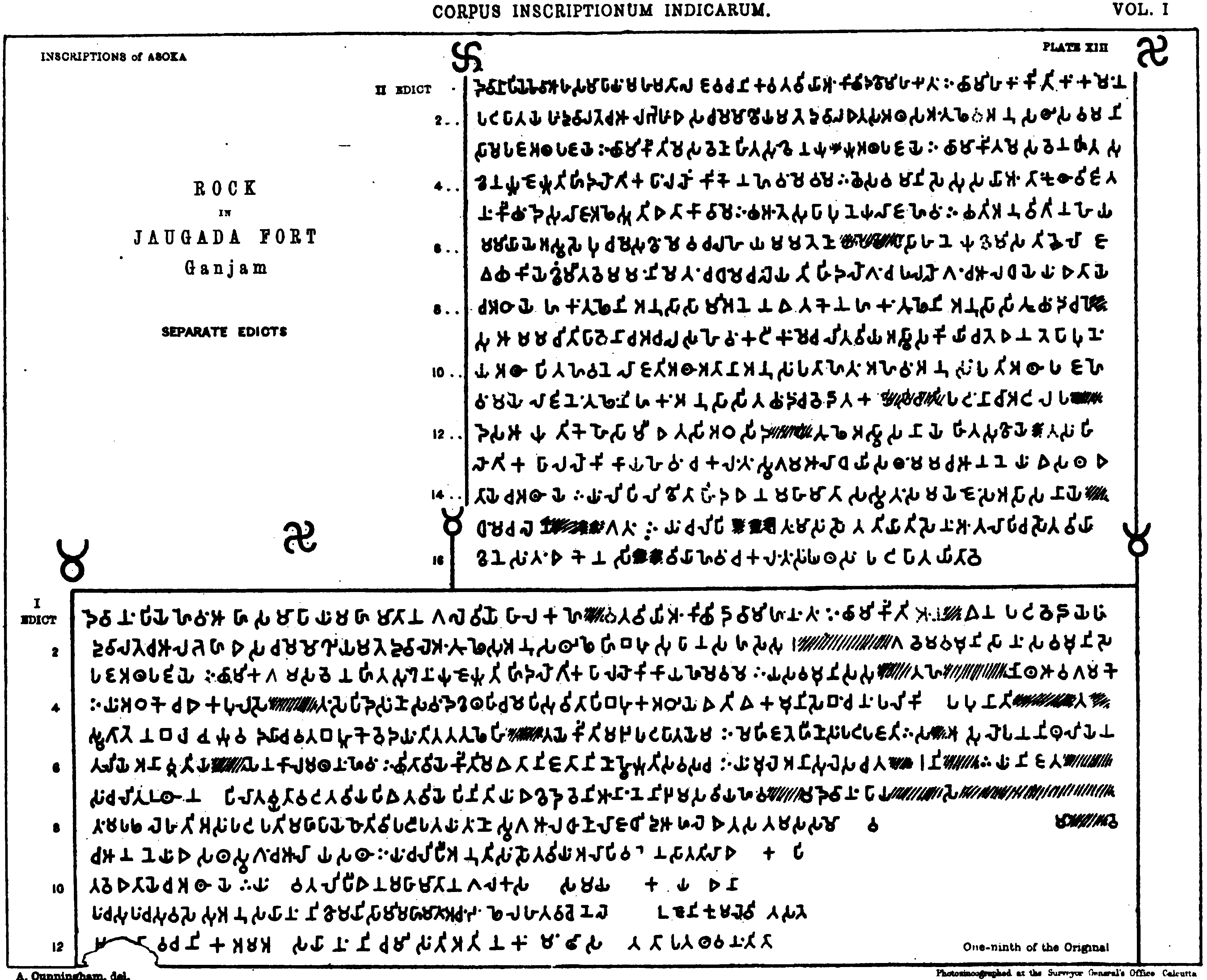
Ashoka's Rock Edict at Jaugada
