= Kalinga War =

261 BCE conflict in ancient India

Kalinga War Odia: କଳିଙ୍ଗ ଯୁଦ୍ଧ
- Part of Conquests of Mauryan Empire
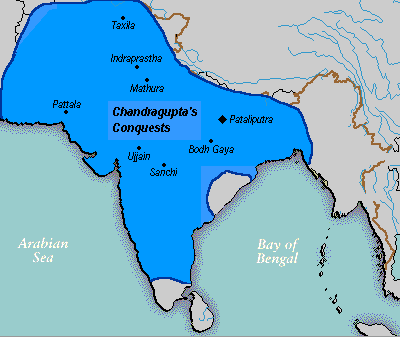
- Kalinga (adjacent to the Bay of Bengal) and the Maurya Empire (blue) before the attack of Ashoka The Great
Date	c. 261 BCE, in the 8th year of Ashoka's coronation of 268 BCE
Location	Kalinga
Result	Mauryan victory
Territorial changes	Kalinga annexed by Mauryan Empire

Belligerents
Mauryan Empire	Kalinga

Commanders and leaders
Ashoka	Unknown

Strength
Unknown	Unknown

Casualties and losses
Unknown	100,000 Kalinga soldiers died, 150,000 deported (figures by Ashoka)
- 250,000 killed

The Kalinga War (ended c. 261 BCE) was fought in ancient India between the Mauryan Empire under Ashoka the Great and Kalinga, an independent feudal kingdom located on the east coast, in the present-day state of Odisha and northern parts of Andhra Pradesh. It is presumed that the battle was fought on Dhauli hills in Dhauli which is situated on the banks of Daya River. The Kalinga War was one of the largest and deadliest battles in Indian history.

This is the only major war Ashoka fought after his accession to the throne, and marked the close of the empire-building and military conquests of ancient India that began with the Mauryan Emperor Chandragupta Maurya. The war cost nearly 250,000 lives.

== Background ==
According to political scientist Sudama Misra, the Kalinga janapada originally comprised the area covered by the Puri and Ganjam districts.

The reasons for invading Kalinga were to bring peace and for power. Kalinga was a prosperous region consisting of peaceful and artistically skilled people. The northern part of Kalinga was known as the Utkala (Uttar: North, Kal: Kalinga), they were the first from the region to use a navy and traveled offshore to Southeast Asia for trade. For that reason, Kalinga was able to develop several ports and a skilled navy. The culture of Kalinga was a blend of tribal religions, Śramaṇa (i.e. Buddhism, Jainism, Ajivika etc.) and Brahmanism co-existing peacefully.

Kalinga was under the rule of the Nanda Empire who ruled over the region from their capital in Magadha until their fall in 321 BCE. Ashoka's grandfather Chandragupta had possibly attempted to conquer Kalinga but had been repulsed. Ashoka set himself to the task of conquering and annexing Kalinga to the vast Maurya Empire as soon as he securely established himself as the Emperor. Some scholars argue that Kalinga was a strategic threat to the Mauryas. It could interrupt communications between Mauryan capital Pataliputra and possessions in the central Indian peninsula. Kalinga also controlled the coastline for trade in the Bay of Bengal.

== Course of the war ==
No war in the history of India is as important either for its intensity or for its results as the Kalinga war of Ashoka. No wars in the annals of human history have changed the heart of the victor from one of wanton cruelty to that of exemplary piety as this one. From its fathomless womb, the history of the world may find out only a few wars to its credit which may be equal to this war and not a single one that would be greater than this. The political history of mankind is really a history of wars and no war has ended with so successful a mission of peace for the entire war-torn humanity as the war of Kalinga.

— Ramesh Prasad Mohapatra, Military History of Odisha

The war was completed in the eighth year of Ashoka's reign, according to his own Edicts of Ashoka, probably in 261 BCE. After a bloody battle for the throne following the death of his father, Ashoka was successful in conquering Kalinga – but the consequences of the savagery changed Ashoka's views on war and led him to pledge to never again wage a war of conquest.

According to Megasthenes, the Greek historian at the court of Chandragupta Maurya, the ruler of Kalinga had a powerful army comprising infantry, cavalry and elephants. According to Indian archaeologist Dilip K. Chakrabarti, the Mauryan army marched to Kalinga via Sarguja, a route that was later followed by Samudragupta during his campaign against Kalinga.

== Aftermath ==
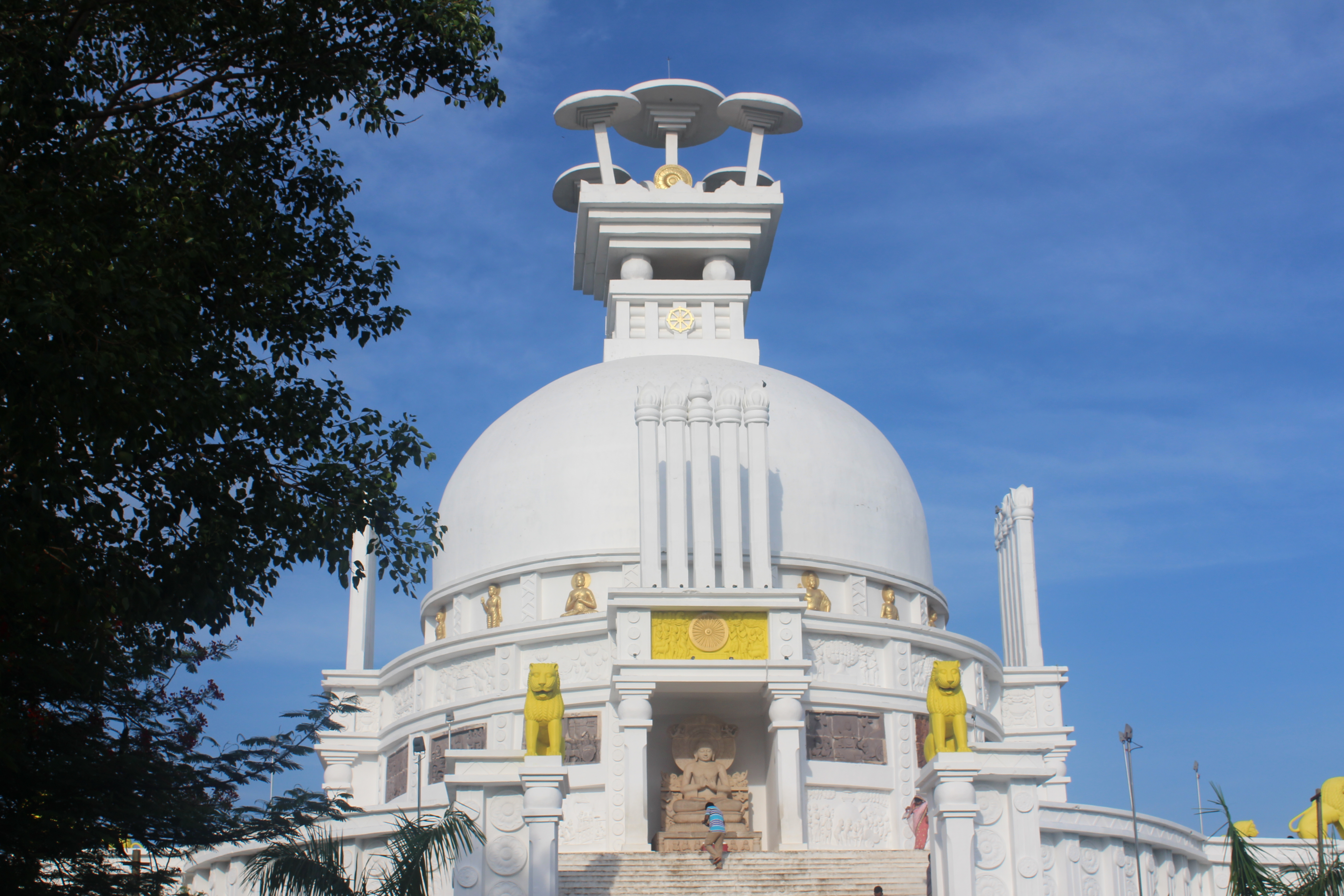
Shanti Stupa, Dhauli hill is presumed to be the area where the Kalinga War was fought.

Ashoka had seen the bloodshed and felt that he was the cause of the destruction.

Beloved-of-the-Gods, King Priyadarsi (Asoka) conquered the Kalingans eight years after his coronation. One hundred and fifty thousand were deported, one hundred thousand were killed and many more died (from other causes). After the Kalingans had been conquered, Beloved-of-the-Gods came to feel a strong inclination towards the Dharma, a love for the Dharma and for instruction in Dharma. Now Beloved-of-the-Gods feels deep remorse for having conquered the Kalingans.

— Ashoka, Rock Edict No. 13

Ashoka's response to the Kalinga War is recorded in the Edicts of Ashoka. The Kalinga War prompted Ashoka, already a non-engaged Buddhist, to devote the rest of his life to ahimsa (non-violence) and to dharma-vijaya (victory through dharma). Following the conquest of Kalinga, Ashoka ended the military expansion of the empire and began an era of more than 40 years of relative peace, harmony, and prosperity.

== In popular culture ==
- The 2002 Indian Hindi-language film Aśoka, is based on Kalinga war
- The book "Ashok and the nine unknown" by author Anshul Dupare is based on the aftermath of Kalinga war.

== See also ==
- List of battles by casualties
- Kalinga (historical region)
