= Tosali =

Ancient city in India

Coordinates: 20°13′35.9″N 85°51′11.0″E

Tosali or Toshali was an ancient city in the present day Odisha state in eastern India. It was the capital of the eastern province of the Kalinga Kingdom. While some scholars tried to identify this ancient city with Dhauli, 7 km away from Bhubaneshwar, other scholars were inclined to identify this city with Shishupalgarh, 5 km away from Bhubaneshwar.

Recent archaeological excavations showing fort ruins and major ancient era weapons, inscriptions and presence of Kushan era gold coins gives credence to the sites at Radhanagar near Brahmani river in Jajpur district to be the most likely location of Tosali.

== Excavations at Shishupalgarh ==
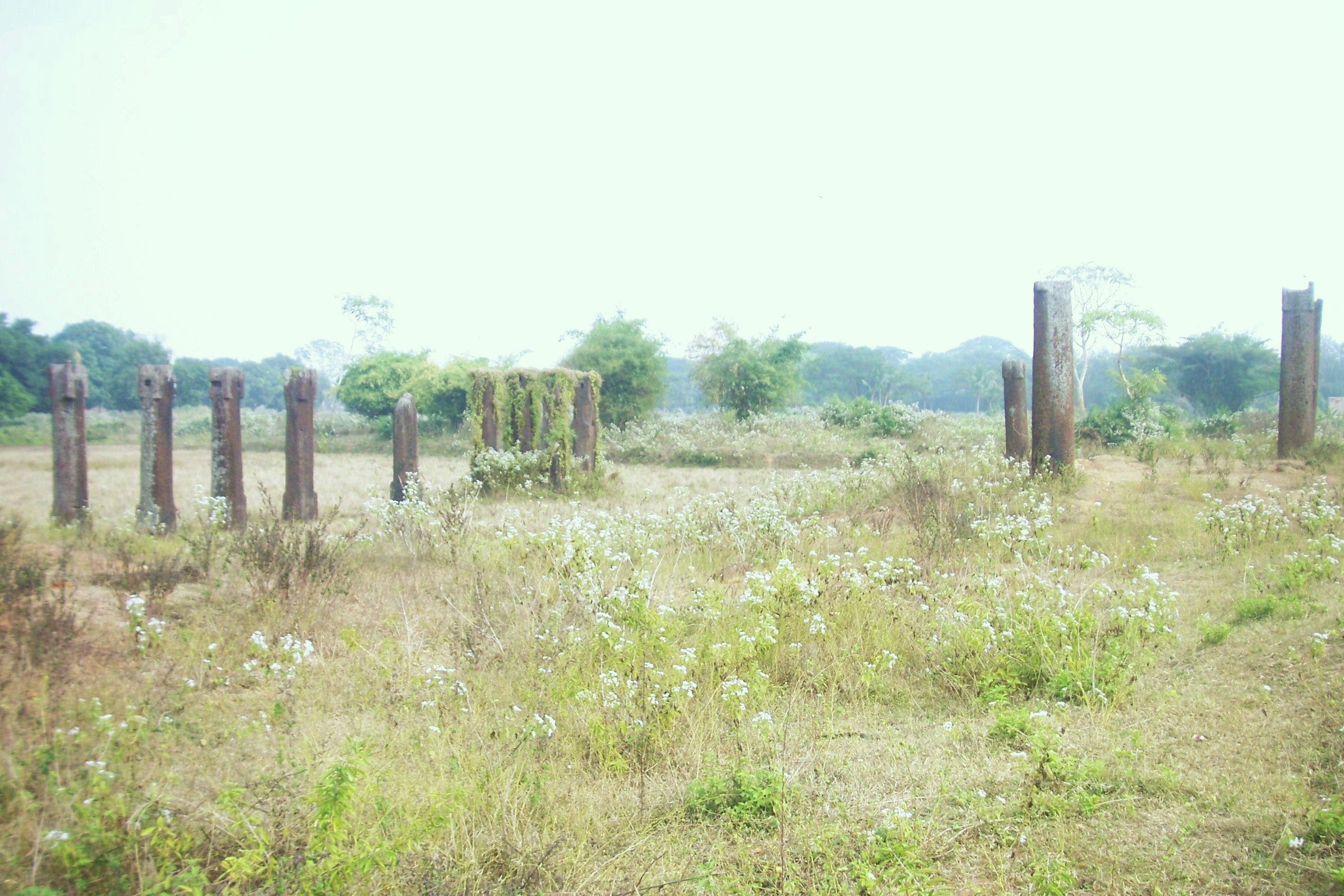
Eighteen stone pillars discovered during the excavations at Shishupalgarh

In 1948, the first excavation in Shishupalgarh was conducted by an Archaeological Survey of India team led by B.B. Lal, followed by another in 1950. These excavations led to the discovery of an ancient fortified urban centre in Shishupalgarh. The mud fortification, constructed in the early 2nd century BCE is almost square shaped and about 1.2 km each side. The evidence of habitation outside the fortified area between 300 BCE to 350 CE was also found during the excavations.

Since 2001, a joint team from the Deccan College, Pune and the University of California started excavating this site again. So far, the major findings of this team include eighteen stone pillars.

== Radhanagar site ==
=== Ashokan stupas ===
The 10 Ashokan stupas described by the Chinese traveller Xuanzang in his travel accounts Great Tang Records on the Western Regions were discovered nearby. The site matches the accounts made by Hieun Tsang, which he mentions that area here Emperor Ashoka built these stupas to commemorate Gautama Buddha's visit and preaching.

== See also ==
- Kalinga
- Maurya Empire
