= Devanampriya =

Pali honorific epithet

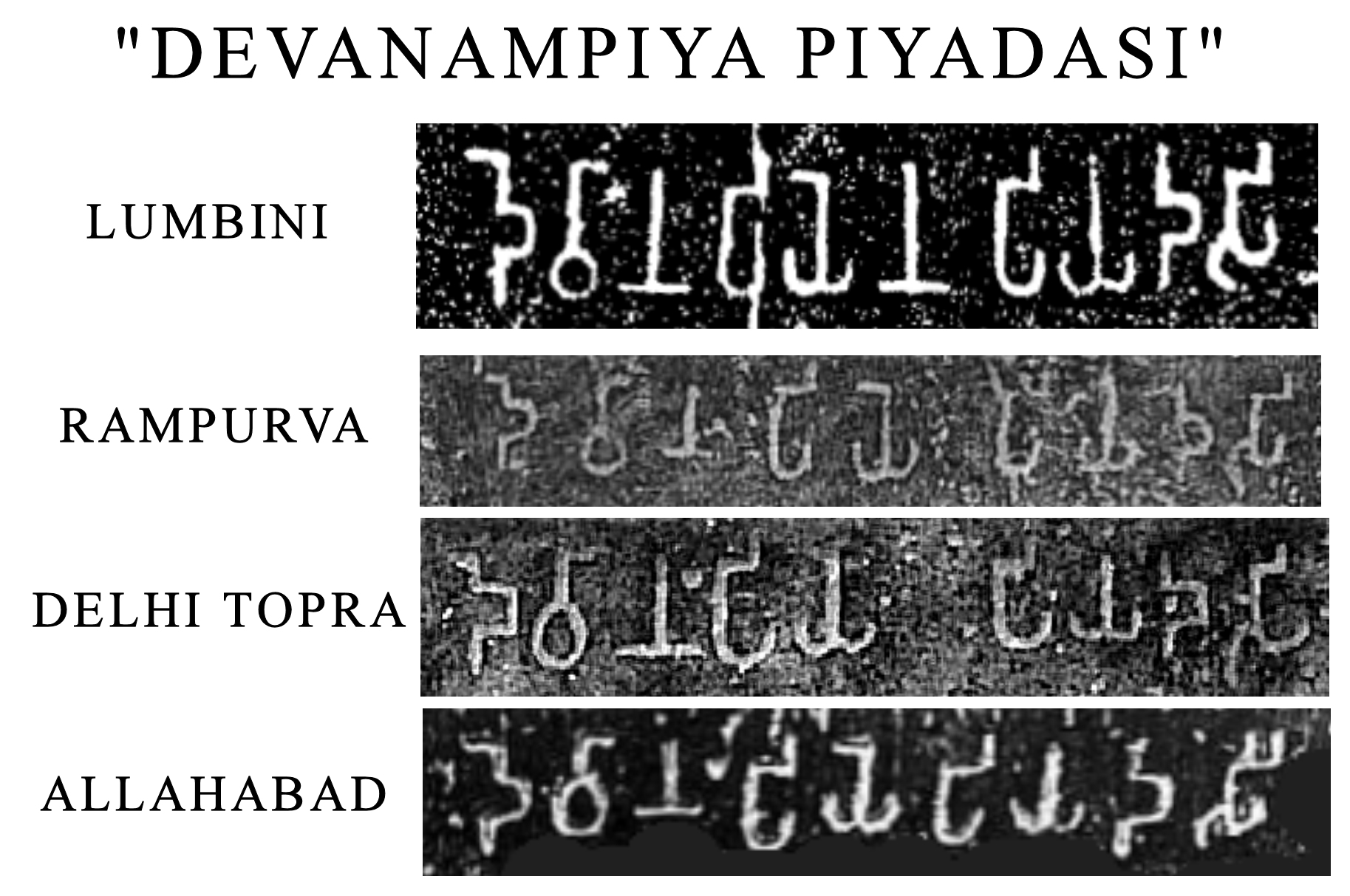
Various "Devanampiya Piyadasi" inscriptions on the Pillars of Ashoka

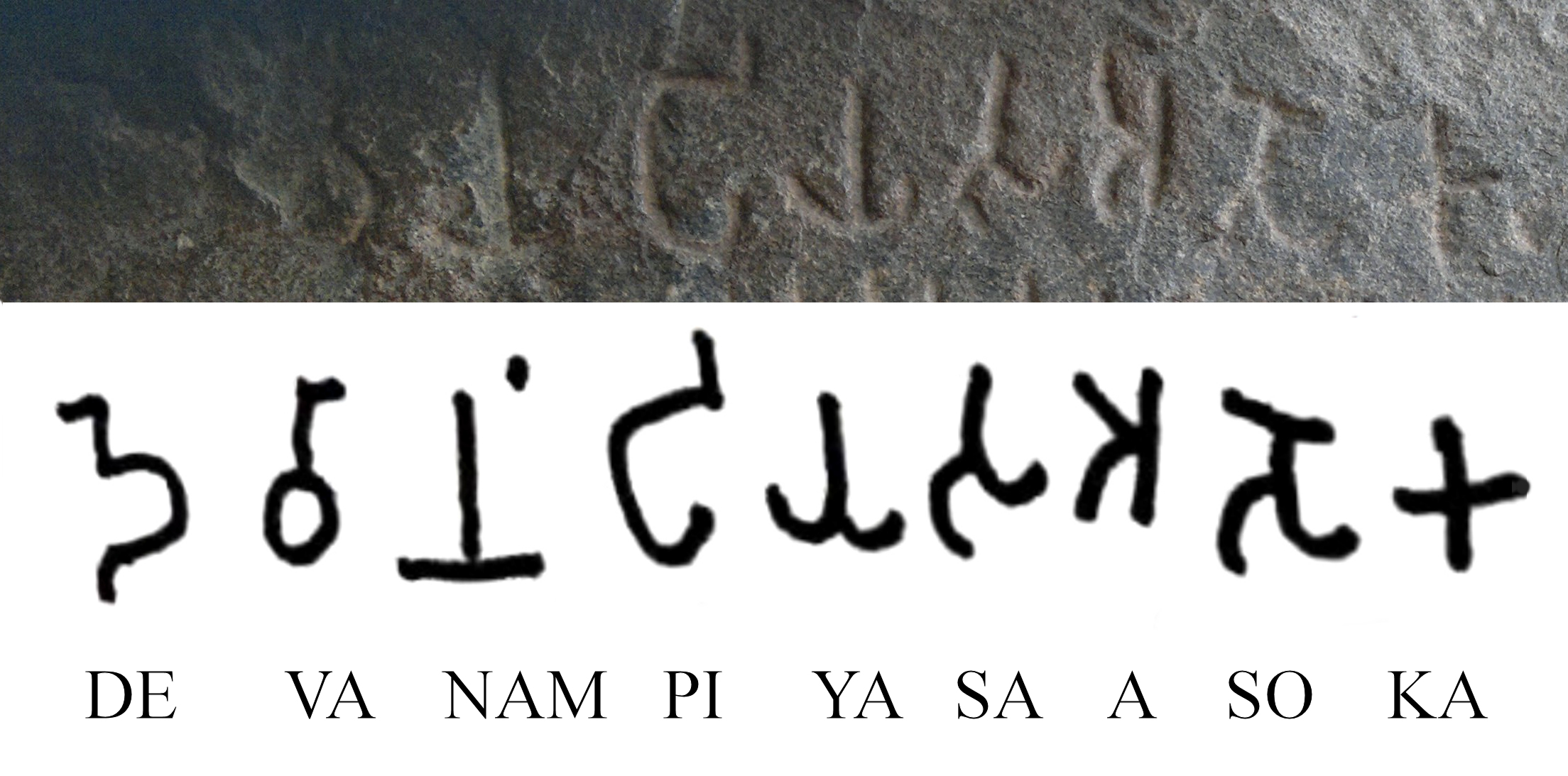
"Devānaṃpiyasa Asoka", honorific Devanampiya (Brahmi script: 𑀤𑁂𑀯𑀸𑀦𑀁𑀧𑀺𑀬𑀲𑀅𑀲𑁄𑀓, "Beloved of the God", in the adjectival form -sa) and name of Ashoka, in Brahmi script, in the Maski Edict of Ashoka

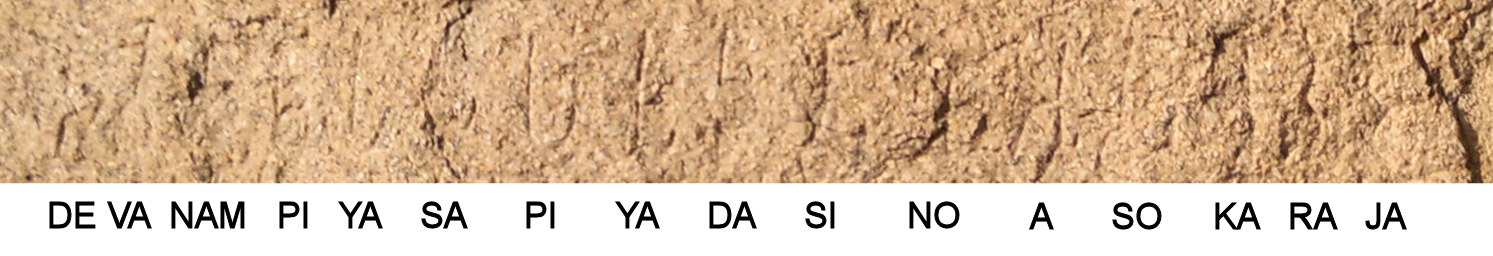
The full title Devanampiyasa Piyadasino Asokaraja (𑀤𑁂𑀯𑀸𑀦𑀁𑀧𑀺𑀬𑀲 𑀧𑀺𑀬𑀤𑀲𑀺𑀦𑁄 𑀅𑀲𑁄𑀓𑀭𑀸𑀚) in the Gujarra inscription.

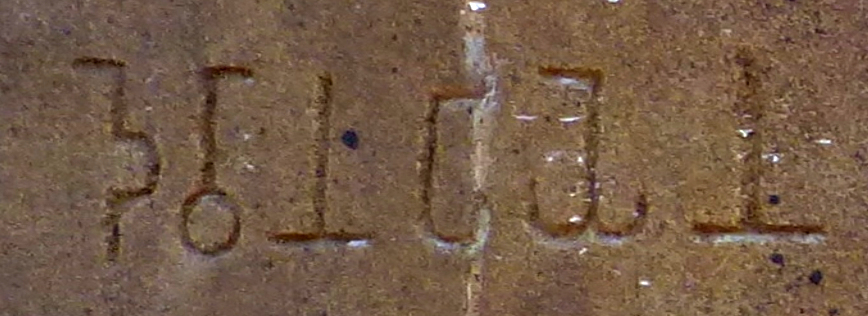
"Devānampiyena" (𑀤𑁂𑀯𑀸𑀦𑀁𑀧𑀺𑀬𑁂𑀦:"Of Devanampiya") in the Lumbini Minor Pillar Edict of Ashoka. Brahmi script

Devanampriya (Devanagari: देवानाम्प्रिय), also called Devanampiya (Brahmi script: 𑀤𑁂𑀯𑀸𑀦𑀁𑀧𑀺𑀬, Devānaṃpiya), was a Pali honorific epithet used by a few Indian monarchs, but most particularly the 3rd Mauryan Emperor Ashoka The Great (r.269-233 BCE) in his inscriptions (the Edicts of Ashoka). "Devanampriya" means "Beloved of the Gods". It is often used by Ashoka in conjunction with the title Priyadasi, which means "He who regards others with kindness", "Humane".

However, this title was used by a number of Ceylonese kings from Uttiya to Yasalalakatissa from the 2nd century BC to the 1st century CE.

The Kalsi version of the Major Rock Edict No.8 also uses the title "Devampriyas" to describe previous kings (whereas the other versions use the term "Kings"), suggesting that the title "Denampriya" had a rather wide usage and might just have meant "King".

Prinsep in his study and decipherment of the Edicts of Ashoka had originally identified Devanampriya Priyadasi with the King of Ceylon Devanampiya Tissa of Anuradhapura. However, in 1837, George Turnour discovered Sri Lankan manuscripts (Dipavamsa, or "Island Chronicle" ) associating Piyadasi with Ashoka:

"Two hundred and eighteen years after the beatitude of the Buddha, was the inauguration of Piyadassi, .... who, the grandson of Chandragupta, and the son of Bindusara, and was at the time Governor of Ujjayani."

— Dipavamsa.

Since then, the association of "Devanampriya Priyadarsin" with Ashoka was reinforced through various inscriptions, and especially confirmed in the Minor Rock Edict inscription discovered in Maski, associating Ashoka with Devanampriya:

[A proclamation] of Devanampriya Asoka.
Two and a half years [and somewhat more] (have passed) since I am a Buddha-Sakya.
[A year and] somewhat more (has passed) [since] I have visited the Samgha and have shown zeal.
Those gods who formerly had been unmingled (with men) in Jambudvipa, have how become mingled (with them).
This object can be reached even by a lowly (person) who is devoted to morality.
One must not think thus, — (viz.) that only an exalted (person) may reach this.
Both the lowly and the exalted must be told : "If you act thus, this matter (will be) prosperous and of long duration, and will thus progress to one and a half."

— Maski inscription of Ashoka.

Historical Usage

Devānaṃpiya may refer to:

- Devanampiya Tissa of Anuradhapura (died 267 BCE), ruler of Sri Lanka based at the ancient capital of Anuradhapura from 307 to 267 BC
- Ashoka (ca. 304–232 BCE), Indian emperor of the Maurya Dynasty
- Dasharatha Maurya (ca. 232 to 224 BCE), grandson of Ashoka, in his Barabar caves inscriptions, in the form "Devanampiya Dasaratha"
