= Priyadasi =

Ancient Indian ruler

Priyadasi

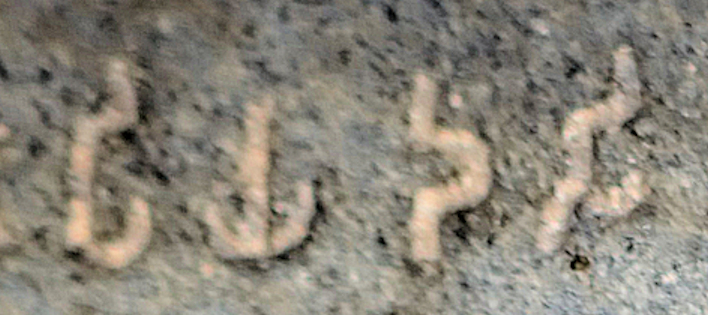
"Piyadasi", honorific epithet of Ashoka, in Brahmi script, in the Barabar Caves.

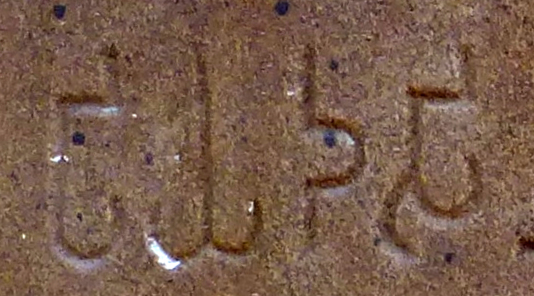
Piyadasi in the Lumbini Minor Pillar Edict of Ashoka.

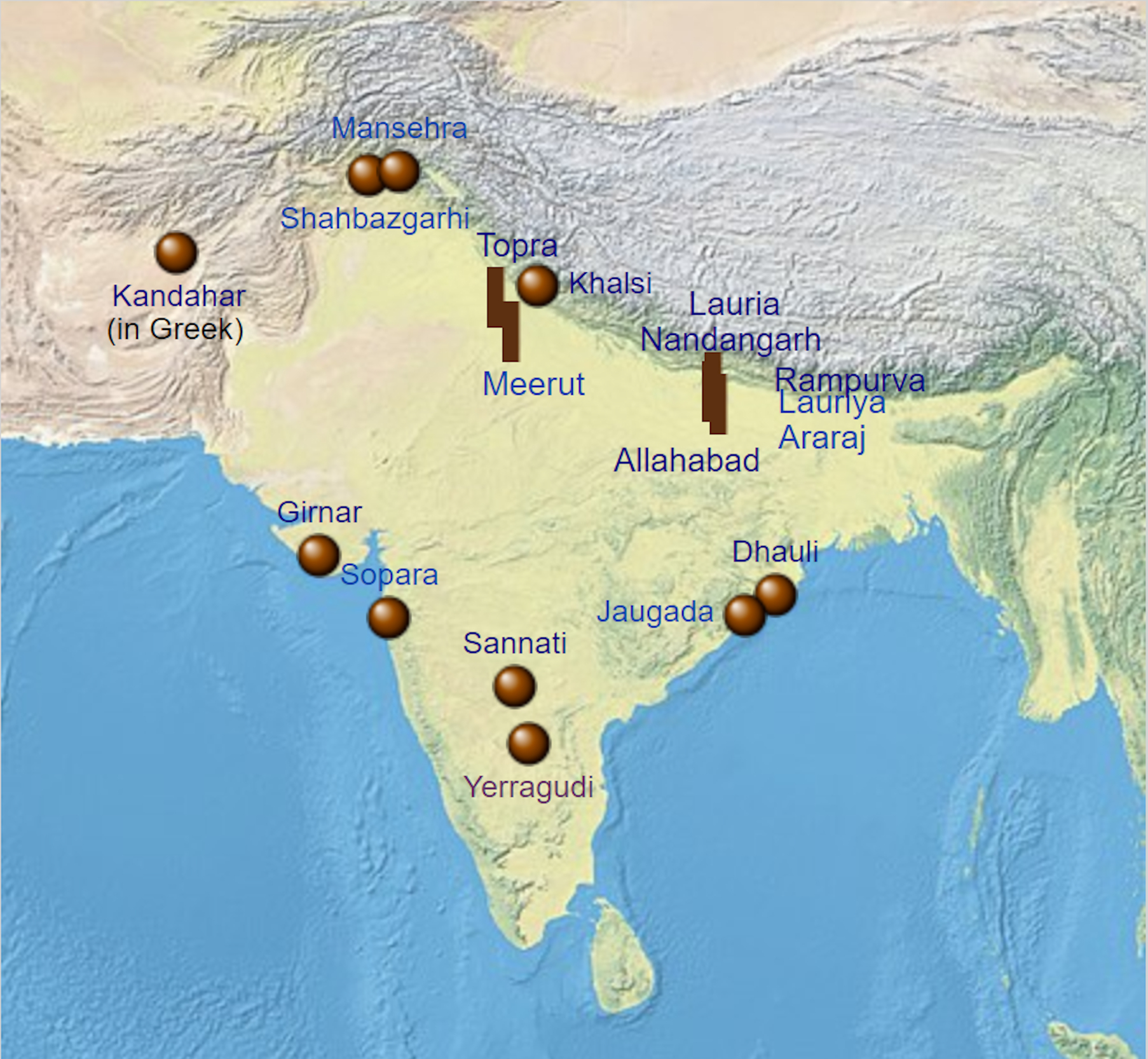
Edicts in the name of Piyadasi or Devanampiya Piyadasi ("King Piyadasi"): : Major Rock Edicts : Major Pillar Edicts

Priyadasi, also Piyadasi or Priyadarshi (Brahmi: 𑀧𑀺𑀬𑀤𑀲𑀺 piyadasi, Imperial Aramaic: 𐡐𐡓𐡉𐡃𐡓𐡔, romanized: Prydrš), was the imperial title used by the Mauryan Emperor Ashoka Maurya (3rd century BCE); literally an honorific epithet which means "He who regards others with kindness", "Humane", "He who glances amiably".

The title "Priyadasi" appears repeatedly in the ancient inscriptions of Ashoka known as the Major Rock Edicts or the Major Pillar Edicts, where it is generally used in conjunction with the title "Devanampriya" ("Beloved of the Gods") in the formula "Devanampriya Priyadasi". Some of the inscriptions rather use the title "Rajan Priyadasi" ("King Priyadarsi"). It also appears in Greek in the Kandahar Bilingual Rock Inscription (c. 260 BCE), when naming the author of the proclamation as βασι[λ]εὺς Πιοδάσσης ("Basileus Piodássēs"), and in Aramaic in the same inscription as "our lord, king Priyadasin" (Imperial Aramaic: 𐡐𐡓𐡉𐡃𐡓𐡔, Modern Hebrew: פרידארש pryd’rš).

In the 19th century, James Prinsep, who deciphered the Brahmi script had originally identified Priyadasi with the King of Ceylon Devanampiya Tissa. However, in 1837, George Turnour discovered a Siamese version of the Sri Lankan manuscript Dipavamsa, or "Island Chronicle", associating Piyadasi with the early Maurya dynasty:

"Two hundred and eighteen years after the beatitude of the Buddha, was the inauguration of Piyadassi, .... who, the grandson of Chandragupta, and the son of Bindusara, was at the time Governor of Ujjayini."

— Dīpavaṃsa.

It was then supposed that this Priyadasi, being a Mauryan, was probably the Ashoka of Buddhist accounts. Because of the association in the Dipavamsa, the title "Priyadasi" is thought to have been used by the Indian Emperor Ashoka (r.269-233 BCE) in his inscriptions (the Edicts of Ashoka).

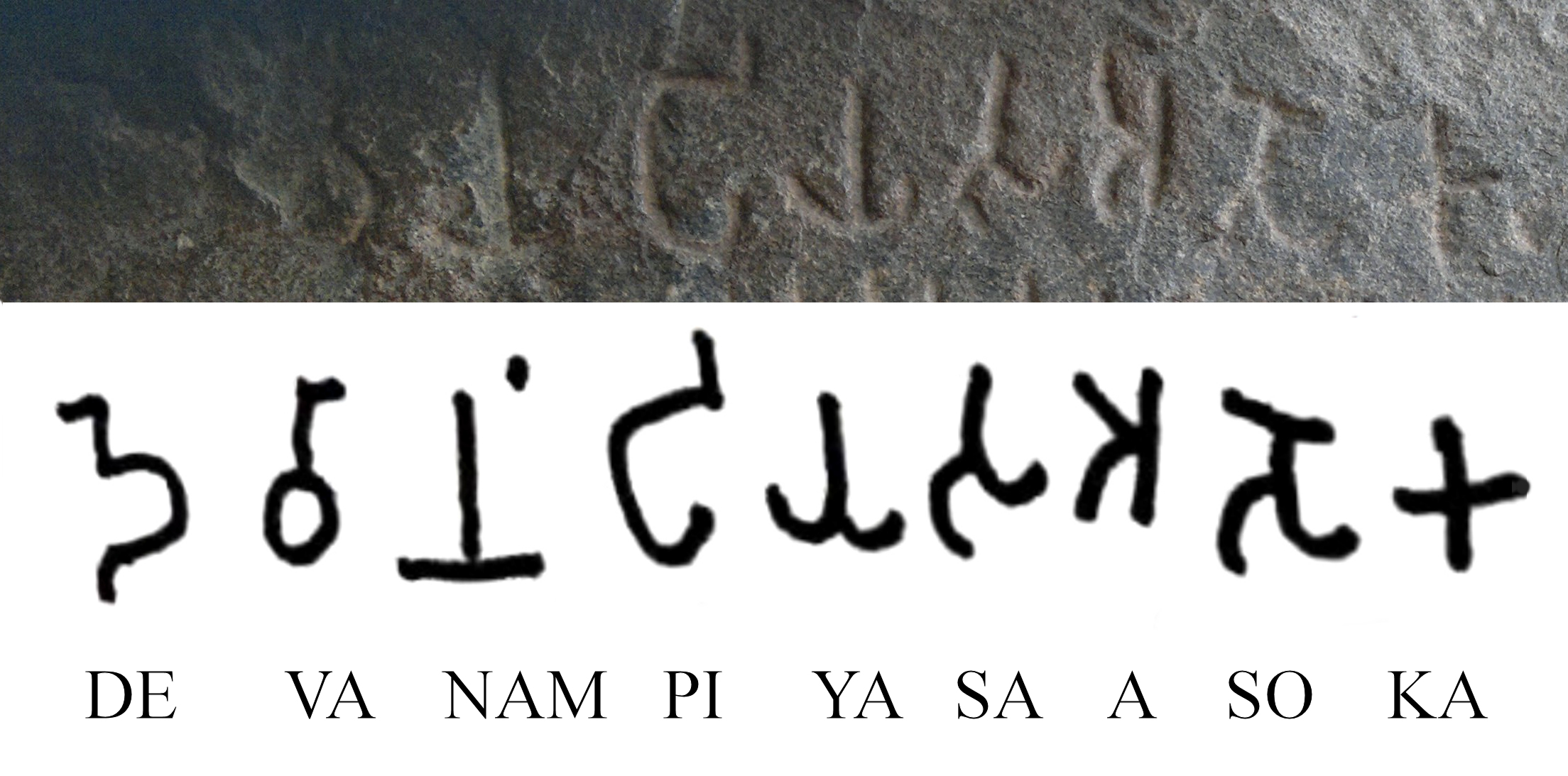
"Devānaṃpiyasa Asoka", honorific Devanampiya (Brahmi script: 𑀤𑁂𑀯𑀸𑀦𑀁𑀧𑀺𑀬𑀲𑀅𑀲𑁄𑀓, "Beloved of the God", in the adjectival form -sa) and name of Ashoka, in Brahmi script, in the Maski Edict of Ashoka

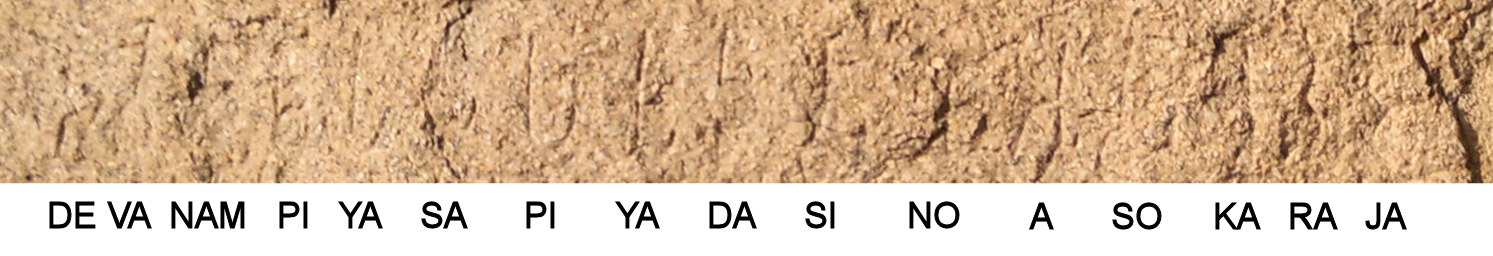
The full title Devanampiyasa Piyadasino Asokaraja (𑀤𑁂𑀯𑀸𑀦𑀁𑀧𑀺𑀬𑀲 𑀧𑀺𑀬𑀤𑀲𑀺𑀦𑁄 𑀅𑀲𑁄𑀓𑀭𑀸𑀚) in the Gujarra inscription.

In inscriptions, the title "Priyadarsin" is often associated with the title "Devanampriya" ("Beloved of the Gods"). Separately, the title also appears in "Devanampriya" in conjunction with the name "Ashoka" as in the Minor Rock Edict inscription discovered in Maski, associating Ashoka with Devanampriya:

[A proclamation] of Devanampriya Asoka.
Two and a half years [and somewhat more] (have passed) since I am a Buddha-Sakya.
[A year and] somewhat more (has passed) [since] I have visited the Samgha and have shown zeal.
Those gods who formerly had been unmingled (with men) in Jambudvipa, have how become mingled (with them).
This object can be reached even by a lowly (person) who is devoted to morality.
One must not think thus, — (viz.) that only an exalted (person) may reach this.
Both the lowly and the exalted must be told : "If you act thus, this matter (will be) prosperous and of long duration, and will thus progress to one and a half.

— Maski inscription of Ashoka.

More recently this interpretation has been questioned by Christopher Beckwith — whose theories are not accepted by mainstream scholarship. He argues that "Priyadasi" could simply be the proper name of an early Indian king, not necessarily Ashoka, who was the author of the Major Rock Edicts or the Major Pillar Edicts inscriptions but not the rest, and who can be identified as probably the son of Chandragupta Maurya (otherwise known in Greek source as Amitocrates, i.e. Bindusara) However, this interpretation has been questioned on methodological grounds by several other historians, who have criticized many of Beckwith's interpretations concerning early Buddhism, inscriptions, and archaeological sites. According to Patrick Olivelle, Beckwith's theory is "an outlier and no mainstream Ashokan scholar would subscribe to that view."
