= Dhauli =

Hill of Odisha, India

Coordinates: 20°11′32.54″N 85°50′22.16″E

- Dhauligiri
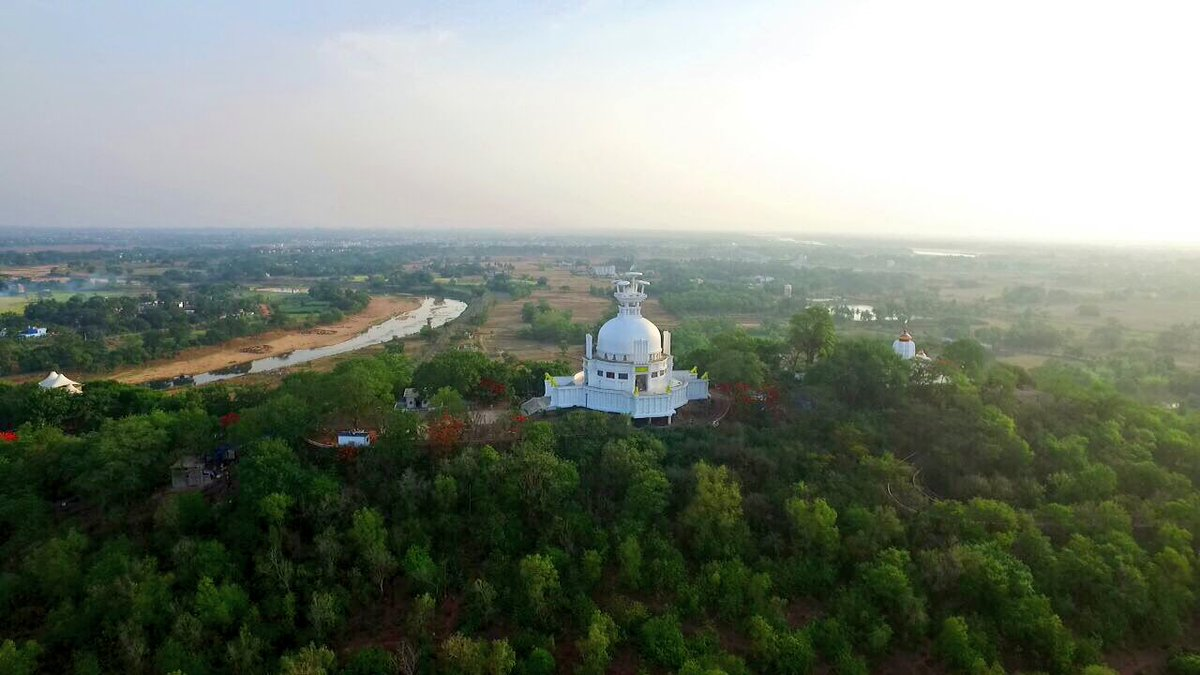

Geography
- Location within Odisha
- Country: India
- State: Odisha
- District: Khordha

Dhauli or Dhauligiri is a hill located on the banks of the river Daya, 8 km south of Bhubaneswar in Odisha, India.

== Significance ==
=== Kalinga War ===
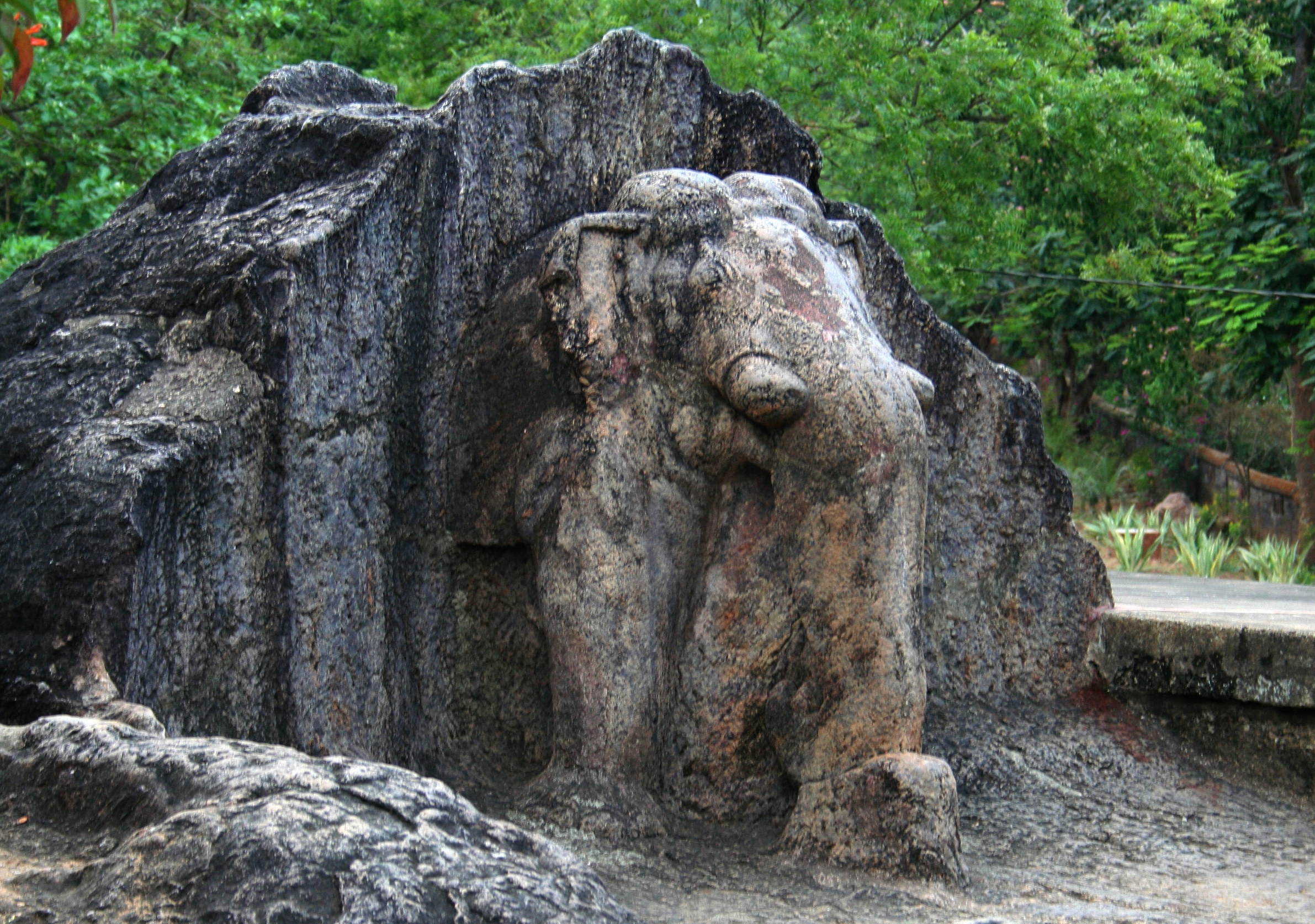
The Dhauli Major Rock Inscription of Ashoka. The front is shaped as an elephant. Dhauli, Puri District, India.

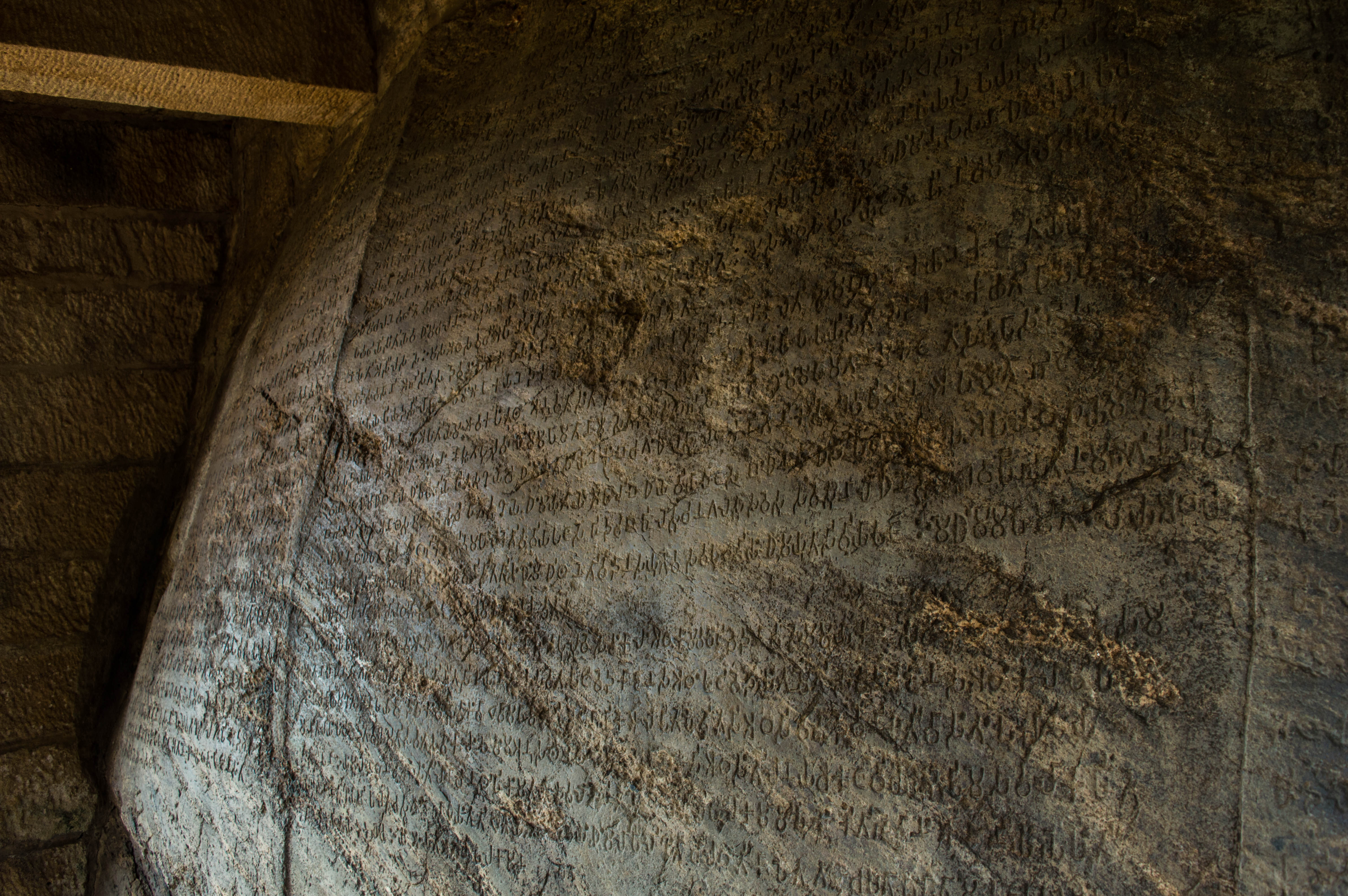
Dhauli edicts of Ashoka

Dhauli Hill is widely believed to be the site of the Kalinga War, a major historical event that led to a transformation in Emperor Ashoka’s life and his subsequent adoption of Buddhism.

=== Santi Stupa ===
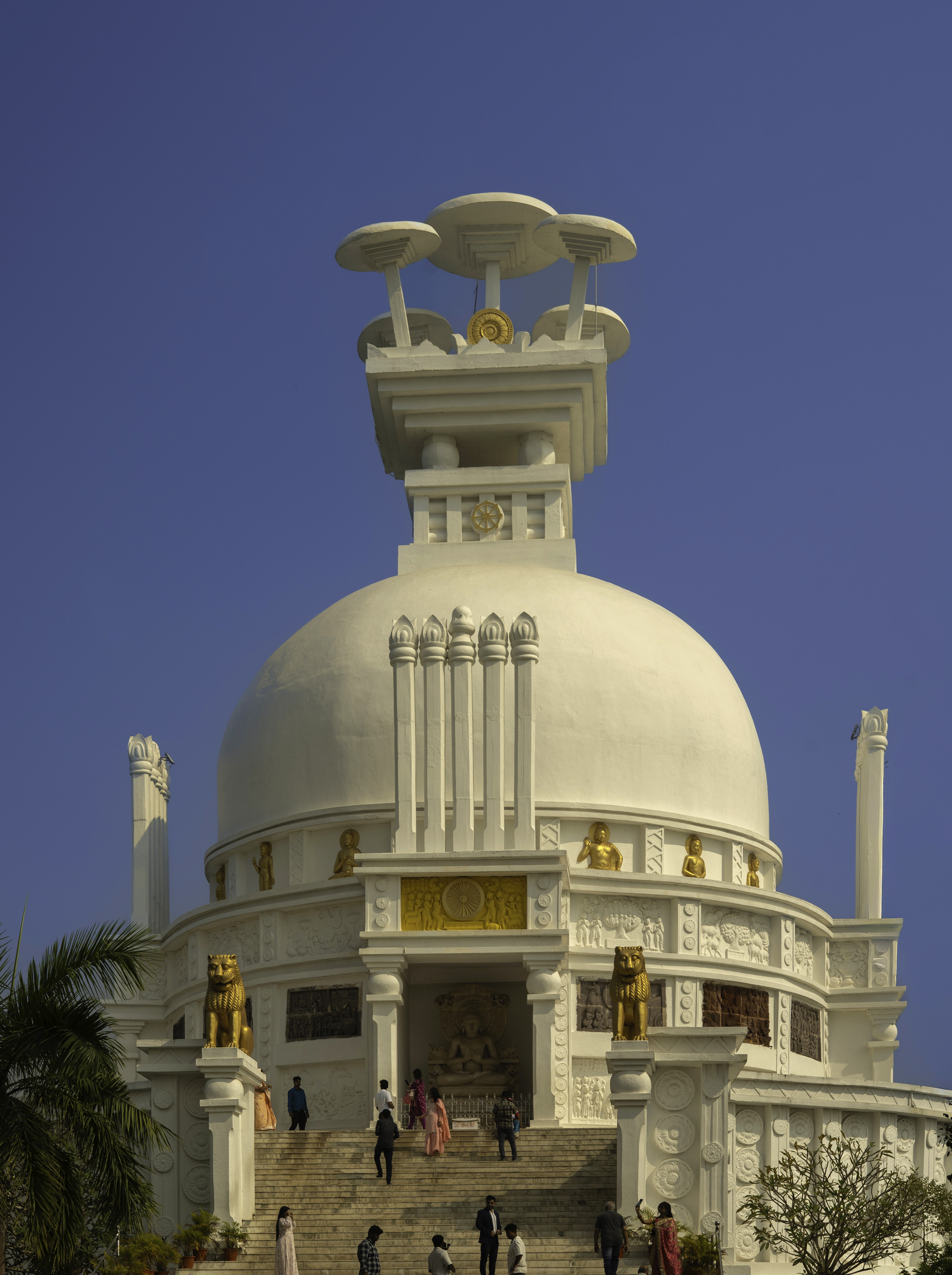
Shanti Stupa (Peace Pagoda) at Dhauligiri

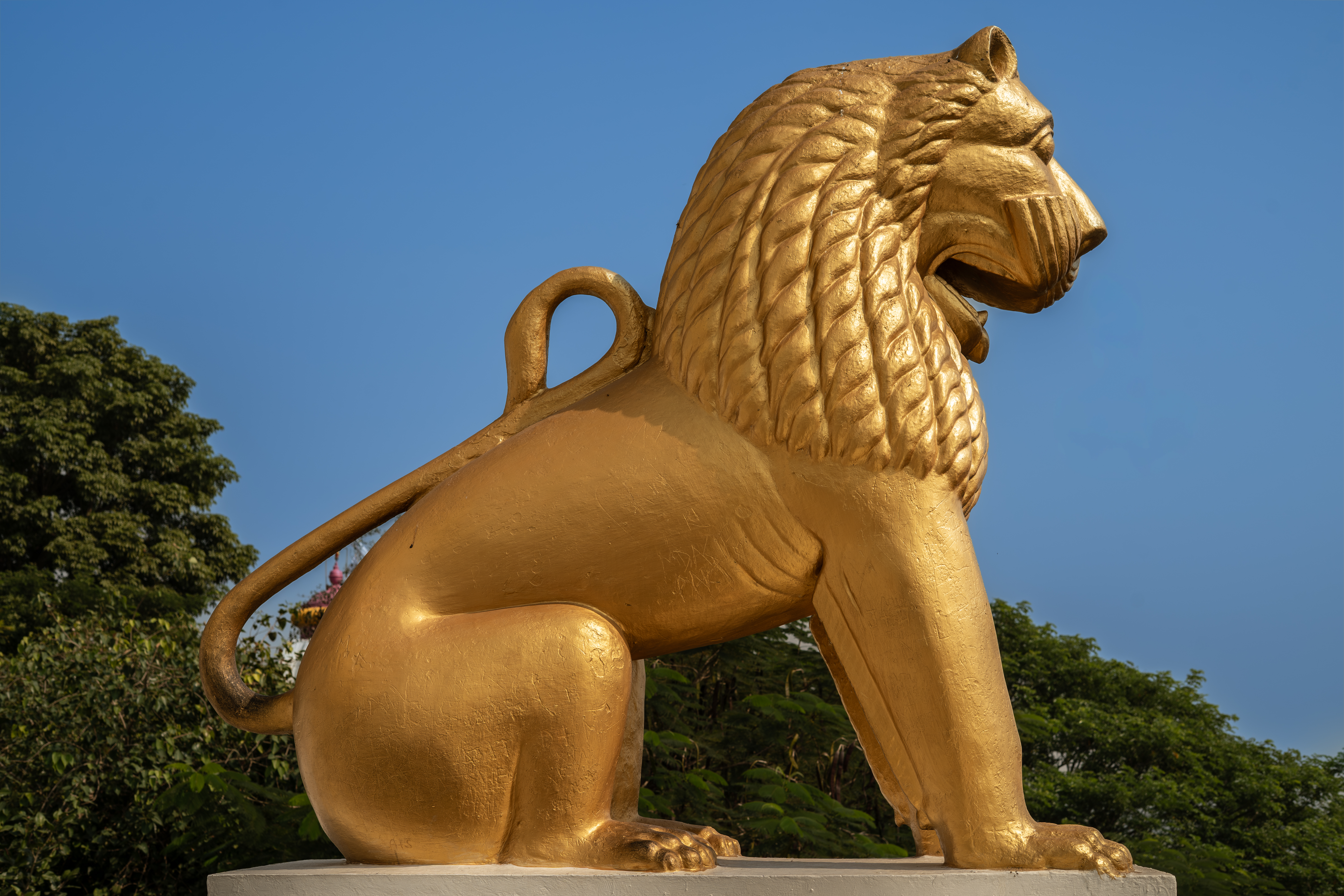
Lion statue at Dhauligiri

Dhauli also known for "Dhauli Santi Stupa", a peace pagoda monument built by Japan Budhha Sangha and Kalinga Nippon Budhha Sangha in 1972.

Dhauli Giri Hills hold cultural and historical significance as an important center of Buddhist heritage, attracting visitors and researchers interested in the legacy of Emperor Ashoka and the spread of Buddhism in the region.
