= Khalsi =

Khalsi may refer to:

- Khalsi, Dehradun, a settlement in Uttarakhand, India
  - Rock edicts of Khalsi, named after the settlement
- Khalsi, Leh, a settlement in Ladakh, India

== See also ==
- Mehdi Khalsi, Moroccan boxer
- Kalsi
