= Yashpal (given name) =

Yaspal is a given name. Notable people with the given name include:

- Yashpal (1903–1976), Indian author
- Yashpal Arya (born 1952), Indian politician
- Yashpal Jain (1912–2000), Indian writer
- Yashpal Kapur (1929–1993), Indian politician
- Yashpal Mohanty (1978–2017), Indian cricketer
- Yashpal Sharma (disambiguation), multiple people, including:
  - Yashpal Sharma (actor) (born 1965), Indian actor
  - Yashpal Sharma (cricketer) (1954–2021), Indian cricketer
- Yashpal Singh (cricketer) (born 1981), Indian cricketer
- Yashpal Singh (politician) (c. 1921 – 2015), Indian politician
- Yashpal Singh Kalsi (born 1978), Indian martial artist

== See also ==
- Yash Pal
