= Yona =

Term used to designate Greek-speakers in ancient India

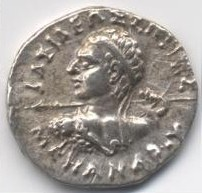
The "Yona" Greek king of India Menander (160–135 BCE). Inscription in Greek: Bασιλέως Σωτῆρος Μενάνδρου, lit. "of Saviour King Menander".

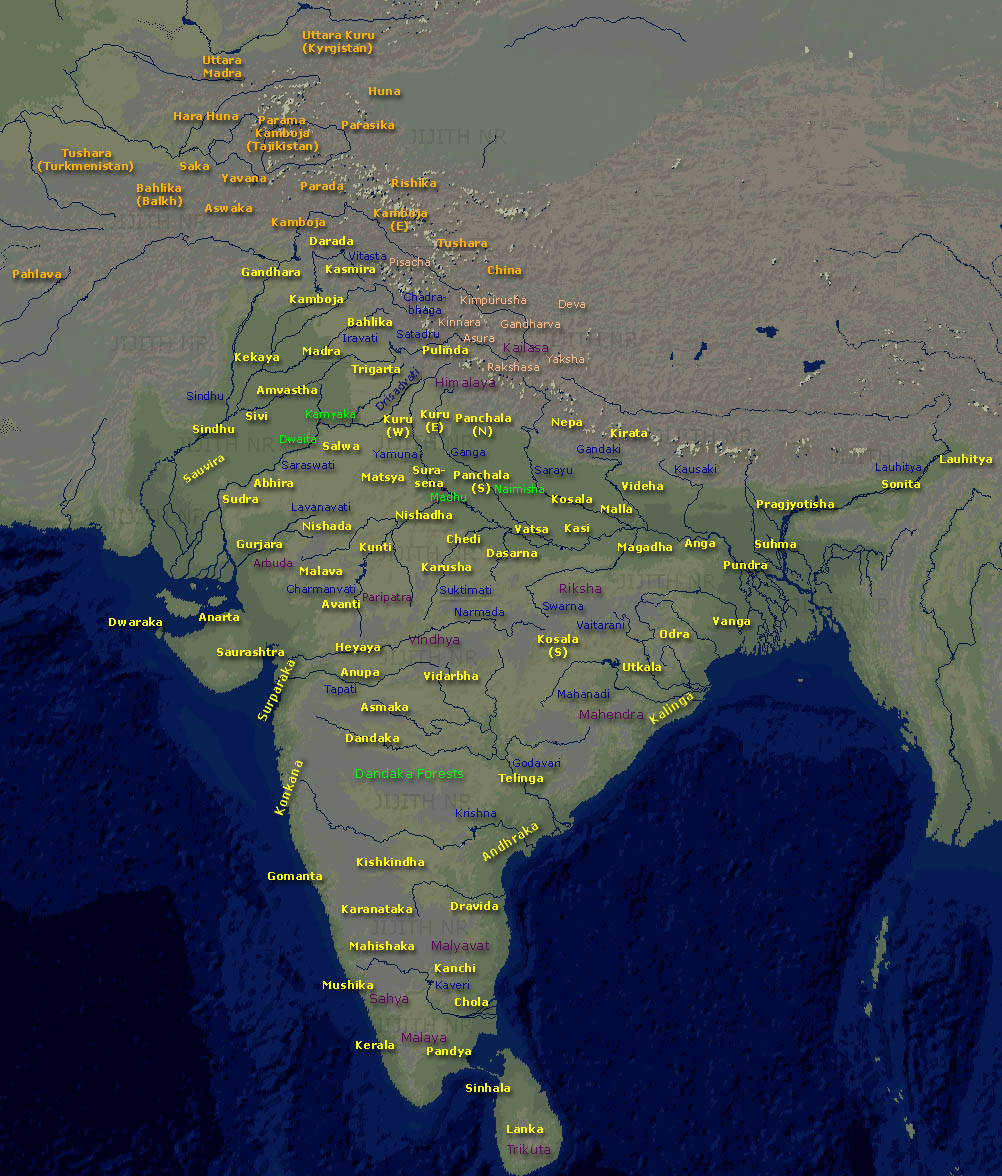
Yavana kingdom alongside other locations of kingdoms and republics mentioned in the Indian epics or Bharata Khanda.

The word Yona in Pali and the Prakrits, and the analogue Yavana in Sanskrit, were used in Ancient India to designate Greek speakers. "Yona" and "Yavana" are transliterations of the Greek word for "Ionians" (Ancient Greek: Ἴωνες < Ἰάoνες < *Ἰάϝoνες), who were probably the first Greeks to be known in India.

Both terms appear in ancient Sanskrit literature. Yavana appears, for instance, in the Mahabharata, while Yona appears in texts such as the Sri Lankan chronicle Mahavamsa.

The Yona are mentioned in the Ashoka inscriptions, along with the Kambojas, as two societies where there are only nobles and slaves.

Examples of direct association of these terms with the Greeks include:

- The mention of the "Yauna" in the Persepolis Administrative Archives (550–333 BC).
- The mention of the "Yona king Aṃtiyoka" in the Edicts of Ashoka (280 BCE)
- The mention of the "Yona king Aṃtalikitasa" in the Heliodorus pillar in Vidisha (110 BCE)
- King Milinda and his bodyguard of "500 Yonas" in the Milinda Panha.
- The description of Greek astrology and Greek terminology in the Yavanajātaka "Nativity of the Yavanas" (150 CE).
- The mention of Alexandria on the Caucasus, "the city of the Yonas" in the Mahavamsa, Chapter 29 (4th century CE).

In general, the words "Yoṇa" or "Yoṇaka" were the current Greek Hellenistic forms, while the term "Yavana" was the Indian word to designate the Greeks or the Indo-Greeks.

== Comparable terms in the ancient world ==
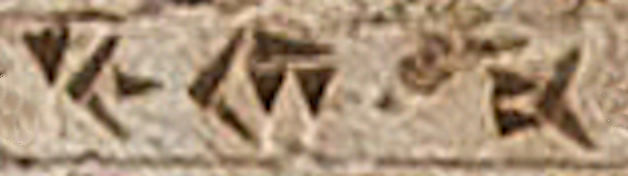
The Achaemenid name for Ionian Greeks: Yauna (Old Persian cuneiform: 𐎹𐎢𐎴) in the DNa inscription of Darius the Great, c. 490 BC

This usage was shared by many of the countries east of Greece, from the Mediterranean to Sindh:

- Egyptians used the word ywnj-ꜥꜣ.
- In Arabic it is Yūnān.
- Assyrians used the word Iawanu.
- Babylonians used the word Yaman and Yamanaya.
- In Biblical Hebrew, the word was יוון Yāwān (Modern Hebrew Yavan)
- Persians used the word Yauna from the Old Persian word for designating the Greeks, namely "Yauna" (literally 'Ionians', as they were the first Greeks with whom the Persians had extensive contact).
- The ancient Chinese exonym for modern-day Ferghana is "Dayuan", which may come from the term Yona.

== History ==
The usage of "Yona" and "Yavana, or variants such as "Yauna" and "Javana", appears repeatedly, and particularly in relation to the Greek kingdoms which neighboured or sometimes occupied the Punjab over a period of several centuries from the 4th century BCE to the first century CE, such as the Seleucid Empire, the Greco-Bactrian kingdom and the Indo-Greek kingdom. The Yavanar are mentioned in detail in Sangam literature epics such as Paṭṭiṉappālai, describing their brisk trade with the Early Cholas in the Sangam period.

After Alexander the Great's invasion, the Greek settlements had existed in eastern parts of Achaemenid Empire, northwest of India, as neighbours to the Kambojas. The references to the Yonas in the early Buddhist texts, and Menander I (Pali: Milinda), may be related to the same.

The earliest attested use of the word in India is by grammarian Pāṇini, (c. 5th century bc) in the form Yavanānī, which is taken by commentators to mean Greek script.

=== Role in Buddhism ===
==== Edicts of Ashoka (250 BC) ====
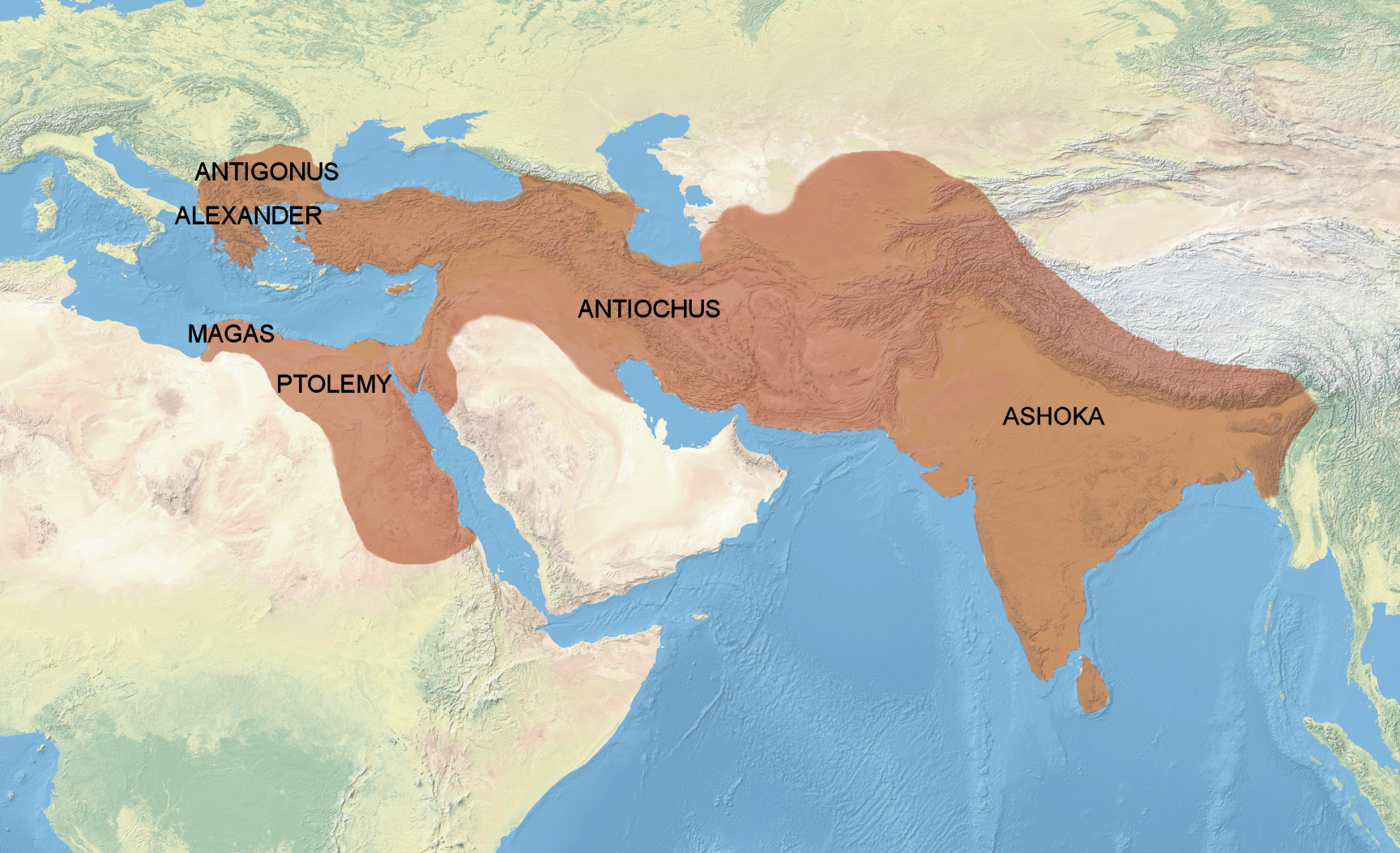
Territories "conquered by the Dharma" according to Major Rock Edict No.13 of Ashoka (260–218 BCE).

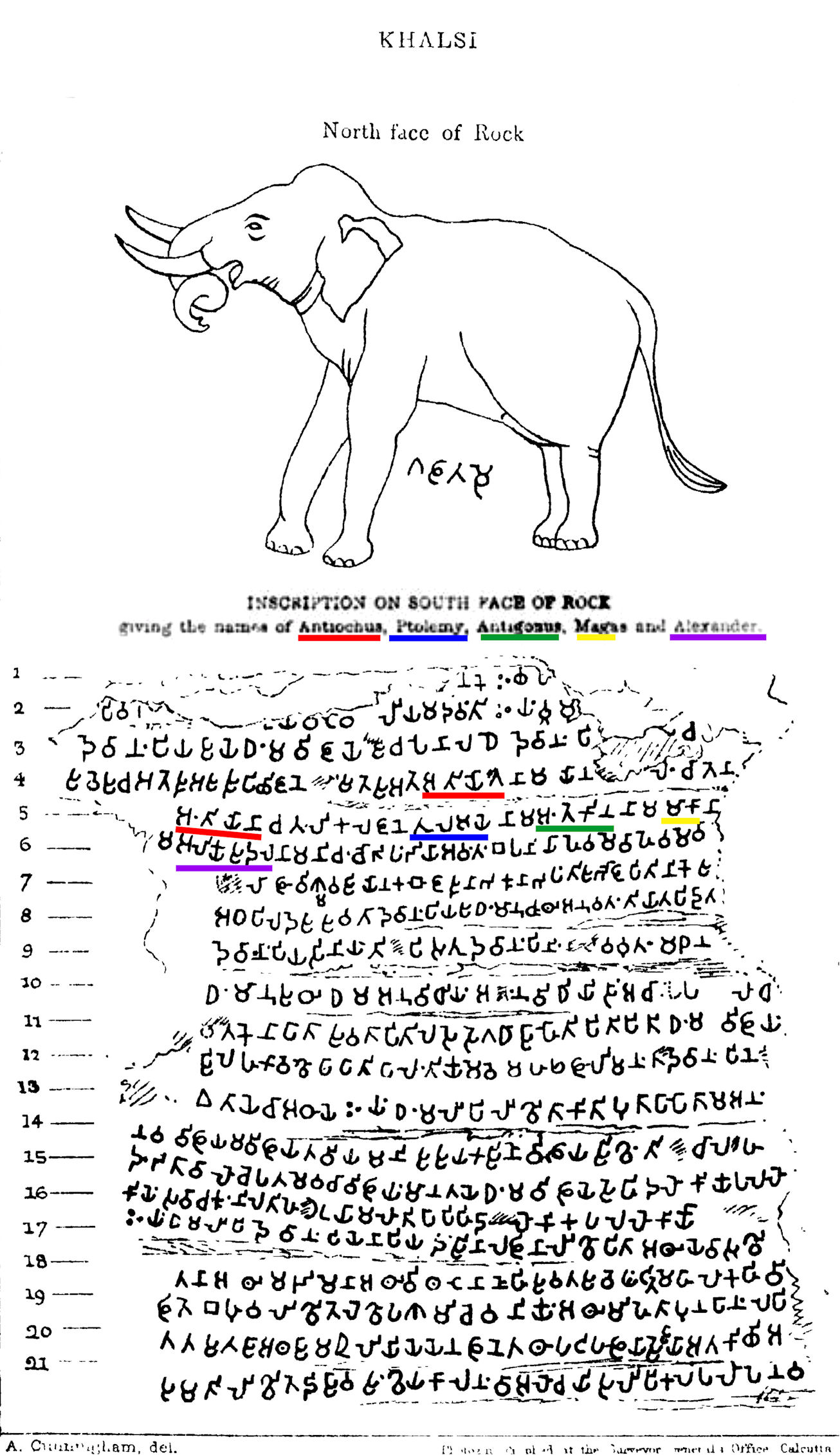
The Khalsi rock edict of Ashoka, which mentions the Greek kings Antiochus, Ptolemy, Antigonus, Magas and Alexander by name (underlined in colour). Here the Greek rulers are described as "Yona" (Brahmi: 𑀬𑁄𑀦, third and fourth letters after the first occurrence of Antigonus in red).

Some of the better-known examples are those of the Edicts of Ashoka (c. 250 BCE), in which the Emperor Ashoka refers to the Greek populations under his rule. Rock Edicts V and XIII mention the Yonas (or the Greeks) along with the Kambojas and Gandharas as a subject people forming a frontier region of his empire and attest that he sent envoys to the Greek rulers in the West as far as the Mediterranean, faultlessly naming them one by one.

In the Gandhari original of Rock XIII, the Greek kings to the West are associated unambiguously with the term "Yona": Antiochus is referred as "Amtiyoko nama Yonaraja" (lit. "The Greek king by the name of Antiochus"), beyond whom live the four other kings: "param ca tena Atiyokena cature 4 rajani Turamaye nama Amtikini nama Maka nama Alikasudaro nama" (lit. "And beyond Antiochus, four kings by the name of Ptolemy, the name of Antigonos, the name of Magas, the name Alexander").

==== In Buddhist Texts ====
Other Buddhist texts such as the Dipavamsa and the 1861 Sasana Vamsa reveal that after the Third Buddhist council, the elder monk (thero) Maharakkhita was sent to the "Yona country" and he preached Buddhism among the Yonas and the Kambojas, and that at the same time the Yona elder monk (thero) Dharmaraksita was sent to the country of Aparantaka in Western India also. Ashoka's Rock Edict XIII also pairs the Yonas with the Kambojas (Yonakambojesu) and conveys that brahmans and śramaṇas are found everywhere in his empire except in the lands of the Yonas and the Kambojas.

==== Mahavamsa ====
The Mahavamsa or "Great Chronicle" of Sri Lanka refers to the thera Mahārakkhita being sent to preach to the Yona country, and also to the Yona thera Dhammarakkhita, who was sent to Aparanta ("the Western Ends"). It also mentions that Pandukabhaya of Anuradhapura set aside a part of his capital city of Anuradhapura for the Yonas.

Another Yona thera, Mahādhammarakkhita, is mentioned as having come from Alexandria on the Caucasus in the country of the Yonas, to be present at the building of the Ruwanwelisaya.

==== Milindapanha ====
Another example is that of the Milinda Panha (Chapter I), where "Yonaka" is used to refer to the great Indo-Greek king Menander (160–135 BC), and to the guard of "five hundred Greeks" that constantly accompanies him.

=== Invasion of India ===
The Vanaparava of Mahabharata contains prophecies that "Mleccha kings of the Shakas, Yavanas, Kambojas, Bahlikas etc. shall rule the earth un-righteously in Kaliyuga ...". This reference apparently alludes to chaotic political scenario following the collapse of the Maurya and Shunga Empires in northern India and its subsequent occupation by foreign hordes such as of the Yonas, Kambojas, Sakas and Pahlavas.

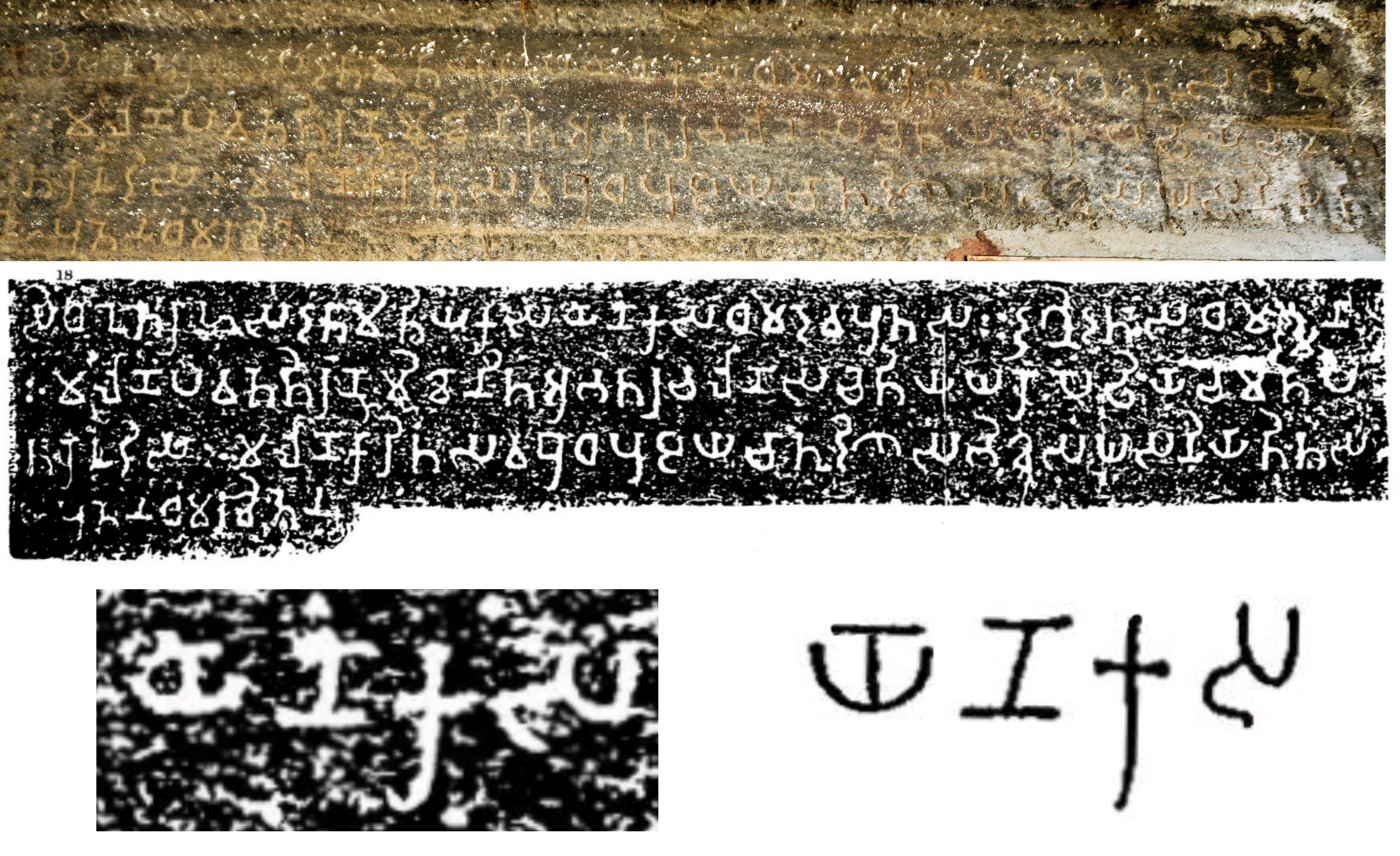
Dedication by a man of Greek descent on a wall of Cave 17 in the Nasik Caves (photograph and rubbing). Detail of the "Yo-ṇa-ka-sa" word (adjectival form of "Yoṇaka", Brahmi: 𑀬𑁄𑀡𑀓𑀲), with Nasik/Karla-period Brahmi script for reference. Circa 120 CE.

There are important references to the warring Mleccha hordes of the Shakas, Yavanas, Kambojas, the Pahlavas and others in the Bala Kanda of Valmiki's Ramayana.

Indologists like Dr H. C. Raychadhury, Dr B. C. Law, Dr Satya Shrava and others see in these verses the clear glimpses of the struggles of the Hindus with the mixed invading hordes of the barbaric Sakas, Yavanas, Kambojas, Pahlavas etc. from north-west. The time frame for these struggles is 2nd century BCE downwards.

The other Indian records prophecies the 180 BCE Yona attacks on Saket, Panchala, Mathura and Pataliputra, probably against the Shunga Empire, and possibly in defence of Buddhism: "After having conquered Saketa, the country of the Panchala and the Mathuras, the Yavanas, wicked and valiant, will reach Kusumadhvaja ("The town of the flower-standard", Pataliputra). The thick mud-fortifications at Pataliputra being reached, all the provinces will be in disorder, without doubt. Ultimately, a great battle will follow, with tree-like engines (siege engines)." "The Yavanas will command, the Kings will disappear. (But ultimately) the Yavanas, intoxicated with fighting, will not stay in Madhadesa (the Middle Country); there will be undoubtedly a civil war among them, arising in their own country, there will be a terrible and ferocious war." The "Anushasanaparava" of the Mahabharata affirms that the country of Majjhimadesa was invaded by the Yavanas and the Kambojas who were later utterly defeated. The Yona invasion of Majjhimadesa ("middle country, midlands") was jointly carried out by the Yonas and the Kambojas. Majjhimadesa here means the middle of Greater India which then included Afghanistan, Pakistan and large parts of Central Asia.

=== Other references ===
On the 110 BCE Heliodorus pillar in Vidisha in Central India, the Indo-Greek king Antialcidas, who had sent an ambassador to the court of the Shunga emperor Bhagabhadra, was also qualified as "Yona".

The Mahavamsa also attests Yona settlement in Anuradhapura in ancient Sri Lanka, probably contributing to trade between East and West.

Buddhist texts like Sumangala Vilasini class the language of the Yavanas with the Milakkhabhasa i.e. impure language.

Roman traders in Tamilakkam were also considered Yavanas.

==== Sanchi ====
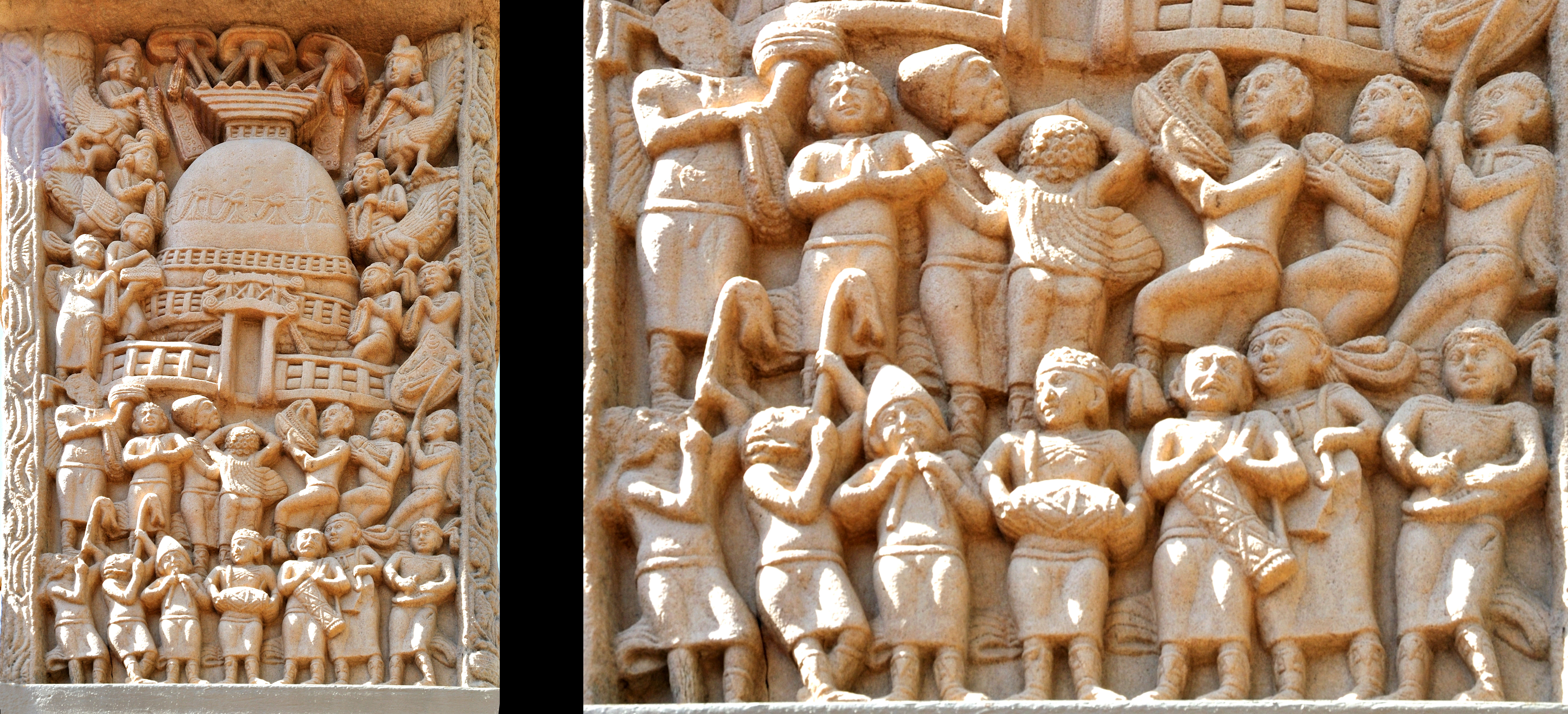
Foreigners on the Northern Gateway of Stupa I.

Some of the friezes of Sanchi also show devotees in Greek attire. The men are depicted with short curly hair, often held together with a headband of the type commonly seen on ancient Greek coinage. The clothing too is Greek, complete with tunics, capes and sandals. The musical instruments are also quite characteristic, such as the double flute called aulos. Also visible are carnyx-like horns. They are all celebrating at the entrance of the stupa. These men would be foreigners from north-west India visiting the stupa, possibly Mallas, Indo-Scythians or Indo-Greeks.

Three inscriptions are known from Yavana donors at Sanchi, the clearest of which reads "Setapathiyasa Yonasa danam" ("Gift of the Yona of Setapatha"), Setapatha being an uncertain city.

=== Buddhist caves of Western India ===
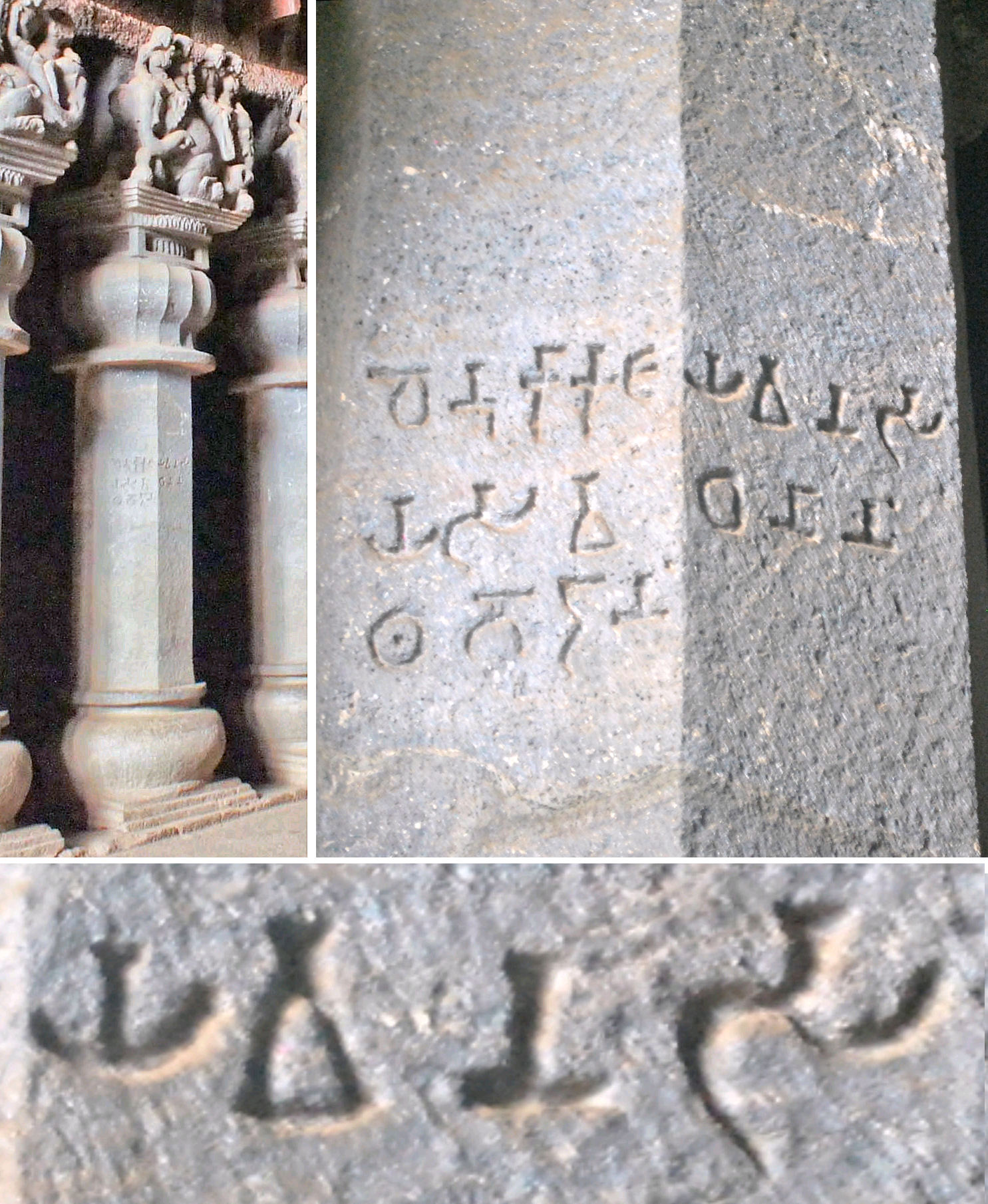
Left pillar No.9 of the Great Chatya at Karla Caves. This pillar was donated by a Yavana c. 120 CE, like five other pillars. The inscription of this pillar reads: "Dhenukakata Yavanasa/ Yasavadhanana[m]/ thabo dana[m]" i.e. "(This) pillar (is) the gift of the Yavana Yasavadhana from Denukakata". Below: detail of the word "Ya-va-na-sa" (adjectival form of "Yavana", Brahmi script 𑀬𑀯𑀦𑀲).

In the Great Chaitya of the Karla Caves built and dedicated by Western Satraps Nahapana in 120 CE, there are six inscriptions made by self-described Yavana donors, who donated six of the pillars, although their names are Buddhist names. They account for nearly half of the known dedicatory inscriptions on the pillars of the Chaitya.

- 3rd pillar of the left row:

"(This) pillar (is) the gift of the Yavana Sihadhaya from Dhenukataka"

- 4th pillar of the left row:

"Of Dhamma, a Yavana from Dhenukakata"

- 9th pillar of the left row:

"(This) pillar (is) the gift of the Yavana Yasavadhana from Denukakata"

- 5th pillar of the right row:

"This pillar is the gift of the Yavana Vitasamghata from Umehanakata"

- 13th pillar of the right row:

"(This) pillar (is) the gift of the Yavana Dhamadhaya from Denukakata"

- 15th pillar of the right row:

"(This) pillar (is) the gift of the Yavana Chulayakha from Dhenukakata"

The city of Dhenukakata is thought to be Danahu near the city of Karli. It is described by other donors in other inscriptions as a "vaniya-gama" (A community of merchants).

The Yavanas are also known for their donation of a complete cave at the Nasik Caves (cave No.17), and for their donations with inscriptions at the Junnar caves.

== The Yonas and other northwestern invaders in Indian literature ==
The Yavanas or Yonas are frequently found listed with the Kambojas, Sakas, Pahlavas and other northwestern tribes in numerous ancient Indian texts.

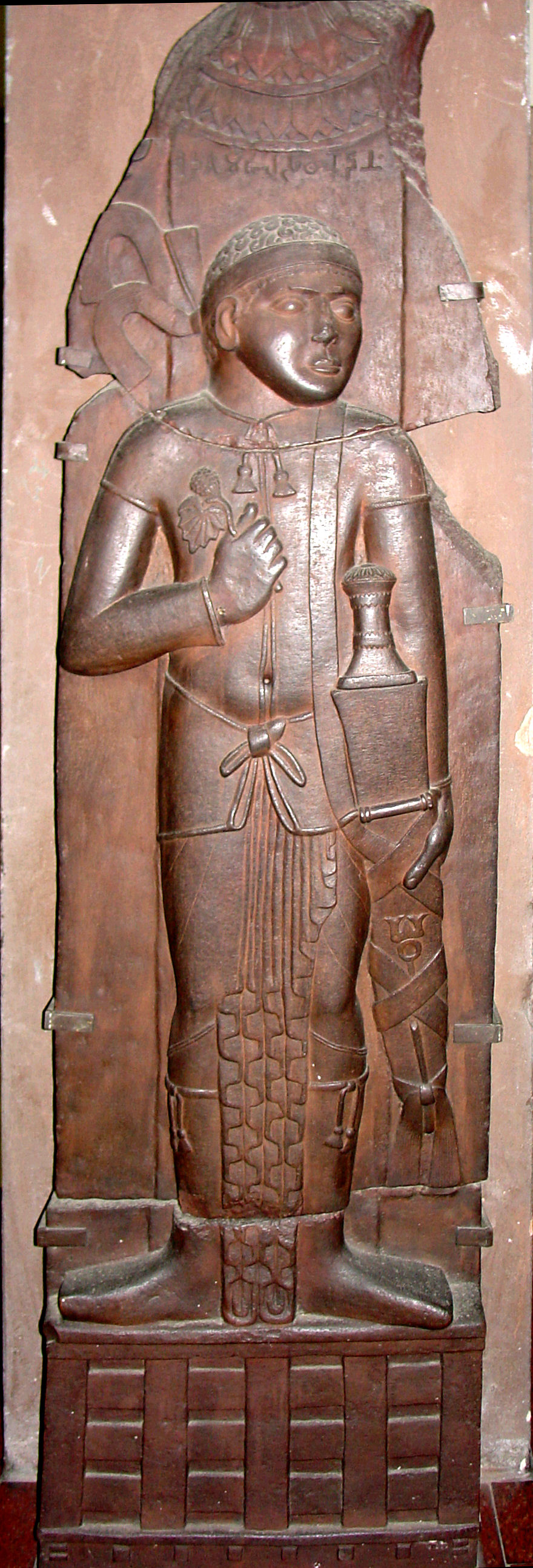
Vedika pillar with possible Greek warrior (headband of a king, tunic etc...) from Bharhut. Bharhut, Madhya Pradesh, Shunga Period, c.100-80BC. Reddish brown sandstone. Indian Museum, Calcutta.

The Mahabharata groups the Yavanas with the Kambojas and the Chinas and calls them "Mlechchas" (Barbarians). In the Shanti Parva section, the Yavanas are grouped with the Kambojas, Kiratas, Sakas, and the Pahlavas etc. and are spoken of as living the life of Dasyus (dacoits). In another chapter of the same Parva, the Yaunas, Kambojas, Gandharas etc. are spoken of as equal to the "Svapakas" and the "Grddhras".

In Harivamsha , Bramhanda purana And Vishnu purana there is also mention of Yavana King Named Kalyavana who invaded Mathura And Dvaraka With the alliance of Magadha King Jarasandha.

Udyogaparva of Mahabharata says that the composite army of the Kambojas, Yavanas and Sakas had participated in the Mahabharata war under the supreme command of Kamboja king Sudakshina. The epic numerously applauds this composite army as being very fierce and wrathful.

Balakanda of Ramayana also groups the Yavanas with the Kambojas, Sakas, Pahlavas etc. and refers to them as the military allies of sage Vishistha against Vedic king Vishwamitra The Kishkindha Kanda of Ramayana locates the Sakas, Kambojas, Yavanas and Paradas in the extreme north-west beyond the Himavat (i.e. Hindukush).

The Buddhist drama Mudrarakshasa by Visakhadutta as well as the Jaina works Parishishtaparvan refer to Chandragupta's alliance with Himalayan king Parvataka. This Himalayan alliance gave Chandragupta a powerful composite army made up of the frontier martial tribes of the Shakas, Kambojas, Yavanas, Parasikas, Bahlikas etc. which he may have utilised to aid defeat the Greek successors of Alexander the Great and the Nanda rulers of Magadha, and thus establishing his Mauryan Empire in northern India.

Manusmriti lists the Yavanas with the Kambojas, Sakas, Pahlavas, Paradas etc. and regards them as degraded Kshatriyas (Hindu caste). Anushasanaparva of Mahabharata also views the Yavanas, Kambojas, Shakas etc. in the same light. Patanjali's Mahabhashya regards the Yavanas and Sakas as Anirvasita (pure) Shudras. Gautama-Dharmasutra regards the Yavanas or Greeks as having sprung from Shudra females and Kshatriya males.

The Assalayana Sutta of Majjhima Nikaya attests that in Yona and Kamboja nations, there were only two classes of people...Aryas and Dasas...the masters and slaves, and that the Arya could become Dasa and vice versa. The Vishnu Purana also indicates that the "Chaturvarna" or four class social system was absent in the lands of Kiratas in the East, and the Yavanas and Kambojas etc. in the West.

Numerous Puranic literature groups the Yavanas with the Sakas, Kambojas, Pahlavas and Paradas and refers to the peculiar hair styles of these people which were different from those of the Hindus. Ganapatha on Pāṇini attests that it was a practice among the Yavanas and the Kambojas to wear short-cropped hair (Kamboja-mundah Yavana-mundah).

Vartika of Katayayana informs us that the kings of the Shakas and the Yavanas, like those of the Kambojas, may also be addressed by their respective tribal names.

Brihatkathamanjari of Kshmendra informs us that king Vikramaditya had unburdened the sacred earth of the Barbarians like the Shakas, Kambojas, Yavanas, Tusharas, Parasikas, Hunas etc. by annihilating these sinners completely.

The Brahmanda Purana refers to the horses born in Yavana country.

The Mahaniddesa speaks of Yona and Parama Yona, probably referring to Arachosia as the Yona and Bactria as the Parama Yona.

== Later meanings ==
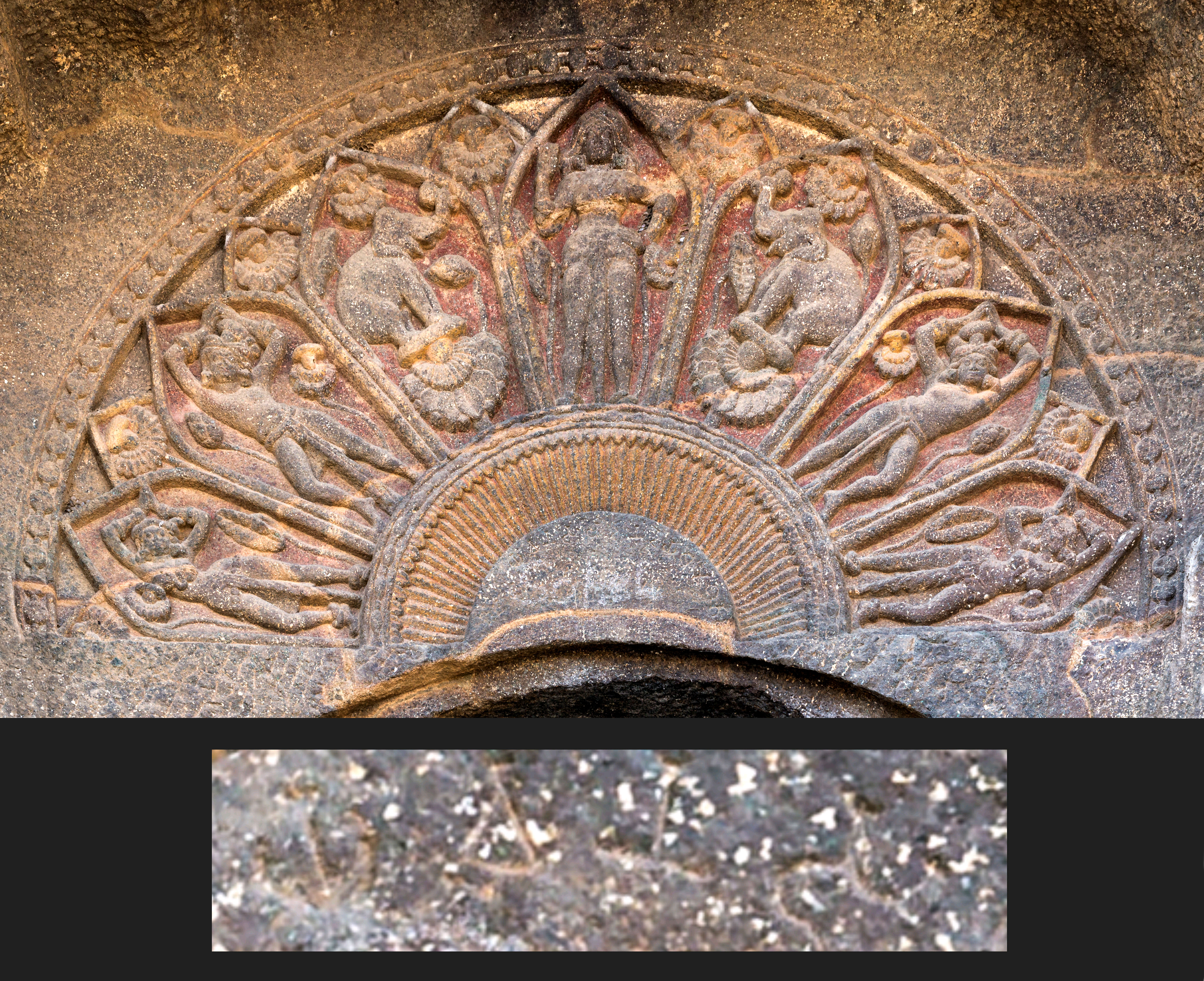
The façade of the Chaitya Hall at Manmodi Caves was donated by a Yavana, according to the inscription on the central flat surface of the lotus. Detail of the "Ya-va-na-sa" circular inscription in Brahmi script: 𑀬𑀯𑀦𑀲, c. 120 CE.

The terms "Yona", "Yonaka" or "Yavana" literally referred to the Greeks, however "mlechas" was also used probably due to their barbaric behaviour as invaders. Indian languages did not base a distinction on religion early on but after the arrival of Islam to the subcontinent, the term Yavana was used along with Turuka, Turuska, Tajik, and Arab more than Mussalaman or Muslim for invaders professing Islam as their religion.

=== Other terms ===
The Chams of Champa are thought referring Đại Việt as "Yavana". However this statement is largely vague. Cham sources refer Dai Viet as nagara Yuen (Cham: nagara yvan, lit. "Viet state"), and the Viets as Yuen (yvan). Both terminologies in Cham materials were written in Cham script and Old Cam, the first dated 1142 during the reign of Harivarman I, showing little linguistic evidence to prove that Cham Yuen and Indian Yavana are connected. Similarly for Kiernan's argument to Khmer Yuon, the Cham reference for the Viet should have been derived from "Yue" or "Viet".

The Khmer word "Yuon" (yuôn) យួន /yuən/ was thought to be an ethnic slur for Vietnamese, derived from the Indian word for Greek, "Yavana", however, it is actually the transcription of the word "Viet" or "Yueh" rather than "Yavana", because the Khmer word Yuon spelled with the diphthong uo, not v in "Yavana". According to Kiernan, "the Pol Pot regime, following French orientalists, mythologized its conflict with Hanoi as part of a millennial ethnic epic"; therefore they altered the meaning of yuon that being misleading implied as savages, foreigners.

The Sinhalese term Yonaka referring to the Sri Lankan Moors, is thought to have been derived from the term Yona.

== Contemporary usage ==
The word Yona, or one of its derivatives, is still used by some languages to designate contemporary Greece, such as in Arabic (يونان), in Hebrew (יוון), in Turkish ("Yunanistan"), in Armenian (Հունաստան Hounistan), modern Aramaic (ܝܘ̈ܢܝܐ Yawnoye), or the Pashto, Hindi, Urdu, Malay and Indonesian languages ("Yunani").

== See also ==
- Greeks in India
- Greco-Buddhism
- Names of the Greeks
- History of Buddhism
- Kambojas
- Mleccha
- Yavana Rani
