= Kadal Pura =

1967 novel by Sandilyan

- Author: Sandilyan
- Original title: கடல் புறா
- Language: Tamil
- Genre: Historical novel
- Published: 1967
- Publisher: Vanathi Pathippagam
- Publication place: India

Kadal Pura (Tamil: கடல் புறா, lit. Sea Pigeon) is a Tamil language historical novel written by Sandilyan. The story is based on the ancient Tamil Chola dynasty. It was named after the fictional ship built by the Chola Commander Karunakara Tondaiman, who later became King Tondaiman. The novel is about the Chola kingdom's invasion of Srivijaya (modern-day Malaysia and Singapore) and Kalinga (currently the state of Orissa). It's a work of historical fiction with a few characters thrown in anachronistically (for example, Aguda was born in 1068, but appears in the novel as a 25-year-old).

Dr L. Kailasam continued the story in his victimology based novel Rajali, and the historical characters of Kadal Pura appeared in Rajali in their old ages.

== Main characters ==
- Illayapallavan (Karunaagara Pallavan)
- Kanchanaa Devi (fictional)
- Manjalazhaki (fictional)
- Balavarman (fictional) - Manjalazhaki's Father
- Anaabaya Cholan (Kulothunga Chola I)
- Virarajendra Chola
- Ameer (fictional) - Anaabaya cholan's Assistant
- Aguda - Ameer's guru
- Kandiya Thevan - Karunakara Pallavan's Assistant
- Shenthan (fictional) - Karunakara Pallavan's Assistant
