= Yavana Rani =

Tamil language historical novel written by Sandilyan

- Author: Sandilyan
- Language: Tamil
- Genre: Historical novel
- Publication place: India

Yavana Rani (lit. 'Greek Queen') is a Tamil language historical novel written by Indian writer Sandilyan. It was originally serialized in the weekly Kumudam in the 1960s and was later published as a book by Vanathi Publishers. The story is based on ancient Tamil poetry. It is a love story set around 2000 years ago, focusing on the Commander-in-chief of the Chola Army. The story takes place during the period of Karikala Chola, one of the greatest kings of the Early Cholas.

== Plot summary ==
The story starts in Poompuhar, a port city that was an important harbour for the Cholas during a time of trade between the seafaring nations and Tamil Nadu. Ilanchezhiyan is the commander in chief of the eastern regiment of Cholas. The army includes both Yavanas (Greeks) and Tamils. When walking across the beach sands of Poompuhar, Ilanchezhiyan finds a beautiful Yavana woman gasping for breath on the bank of the Kaveri River. He takes her to his palace and gets assistance from Hippalaas, one of the many Greek soldiers in the Chola army, in rescuing the woman. Hippalaas is scared to go near the woman, and instead salutes her. Ilanchezhiyan learns from Hippalaas that the woman is of royal origin after seeing the royal emblem of a swan on her golden bracelet. Meanwhile, the Yavana chief of the fort hears of the queen's presence in Poompuhar. He sets out to capture Ilanchezhiyan and Hippalaas for taking the queen.

Ilanchezhiyan escapes the Yavana soldiers, using the queen as a hostage. With his sword on her back, he rides away into the thick forest on his white Arabic horse. Tiberius, a great naval commander of the time, who had arrived with the Greek queen to the shores of Poompuhar, chases Ilanchezhiyan in an attempt to rescue the queen. The queen falls in love with Ilanchezhiyan, however, and helps him escape from Tiberius.

Illanchezhiyan flees with the queen and Hippalaas. Brahmananda, a monk and politician, helps them escape through a secret tunnel into a temple. They disguise themselves as monks performing bhajans, and emerge from the temple's sanctum sanctorum.

Ilanchezhiyan learns from Brahmananda of the murder of Ilanchetchenni, the emperor of the Chola kingdom, by his enemies. He agrees to spy for Brahmananda in Uraiyur, the capital of the ancient Cholas. During the mission, Ilanchezhiyan is captured and imprisoned in a cave by Irungovel, the slayer of the king. Ilanchezhiyan escapes to see a palace burning on the other side of Amaravathi river. He rescues a handsome teenage youth (except for his charred legs) from seven armed soldiers. Ilanchezhiyan helps the youth to a palace, where his lover, Poovazhagi, was imprisoned. It is revealed that the youth is the prince of the Chola kingdom. With the help of Ilanchezhiyan, the prince escapes into the forest.

Ilanchezhiyan and the Yavana queen run in the opposite direction, straight into Tiberius. Tiberius poisons Illanchezhiyan and crowns the Yavana as the Queen of Poompuhar on the day of Venus festival. The queen knows the ancient Venus festival occurs on the date of Indrathiruvizha of Poompuhar. Meanwhile, Ilanchezhiyan finds himself in a ship en route to Greece and learns that he was drugged and will be thrown to the lions. Hippalaas rescues him from the ship by throwing him into sea. They survive a shark attack, and a powerful wave takes them to shore.

When Ilanchezhiyan opens his eyes, he finds himself being sold as a slave along with Hippalaas. Ilanchezhiyan and Hippalaas return to sea as slaves to be sold in Greece. The slave ship is then attacked and captured by pirates of Erythraean sea. The pirate captain is persuaded by Illanchezhiyan to invade Ghana (present day Yemen or Oman). The pirates are taken as prisoners by Iliasu, referred to in the Periplus of the Erythraean Sea as Eleazus, the King of Ghana.

The king forces Ilanchezhiyan to become a disciple of the head priest. Ilanchezhiyan lures the priest on board the slave ship for a religious debate. With the help of Alima, the adopted daughter of the lady commander Iliyasu, and his slave friends, Ilanchezhiyan travels back to Tamil Nadu. The political situation becomes tense when Illanchezhiyan arrives. Tiberius builds a fortress impregnable to anyone from sea or land. The fort has two mechanical towers which can throw spears for several miles.

Illanchezhiyan is in the dense forest of Guna Nadu, when he sees a huge army disguised as farmers. The army destroys tanks, ponds, farmlands and buildings under the orders of Illanchezhiyan. Irungovel, the assassin of the emperor, wages war with them but is defeated. Illanchezhiyan and the army enter the fortress of Poompuhar on the day of the Venus festival, and capture the signposts and mechanical towers. The key to the mechanical towers is given to Illanchezhiyan by the queen. Tiberius, his dreams of a Greek empire in Tamil Nadu shattered and now surrounded by the enemy army, stabs her before Illanchezhiyan can run to her rescue. Illanchezhiyan's spear throwing expert commander kills Tiberius, but a second too late.

Illanchezhiyan cries for his beloved dead queen. The novel ends with the rightful ownership of the Chola Empire being given to the prince (whom Illanchezhiyan had saved earlier) known later as the legendary Karikala Chola. Illanchezhiyan marries his lover Poovazhagi and then assumes his post as the commander for the Chola Empire.
