= Sandilyan =

Tamil writer (1910–1987)

- Born: Bhashyam Iyengar; 6 November 1910; Tirukoilur, South Arcot District, Madras Presidency, British India (now in Kallakurichi district, Tamil Nadu, India)
- Died: 11 September 1987 (aged 76)
- Education: College – St. Joseph's College, Tiruchirappalli
- Occupations: Novelist, essayist
- Spouse: Ranganayaki
- Children: 3
- Relatives: Srimushnam V. Raja Rao (son-in-law); Sean Roldan (grandson)
- Writing career
- Period: 1930 – 1987
- Genres: Tamil Historic Fiction, Tamil Social Fiction
- Notable works: Kadal Pura, Yavana Rani, Mannan Magal

Bhashyam Iyengar (6 November 1910 – 11 September 1987), better known by the pen name of Sandilyan, was an Indian writer known for his historical fiction novels in Tamil. He is known for his historical romance and adventure novels, often set in the times of the Chola and Pandya empires.

== Early life ==
Sandilyan was born in Tirukoilur (a town in present-day Kallakurichi District, Tamil Nadu) on 10 November 1910 to Ramanujam Iyengar and Poongovilvalli. His family was from Thiruindalur village near Mayiladuthurai. He did his schooling in Chennai Pachaiyappa's School and Saidapet Model School. His college education came from Tiruchirappalli St. Joseph's College. While in college, he was influenced by the visit of C. Rajagopalachari and joined the Indian independence movement. He became a member of the Indian National Congress (INC). He married Ranganayaki in 1929.

== Early career ==
After finishing college he moved to T. Nagar in the 1930s. He became friends with his neighbours V.Swaminatha Sharma who was working in Thiru. Vi. Ka's weekly magazine Navasakthi and the noted Tamil writer Kalki Krishnamurthy. With their encouragement he wrote his first short story titled Shantha Seelan. Impressed with his work, Kalki published his short stories like Kannammavin Kadhal, Adhirshtam in Ananda Vikatan. Encouraged by this success Sandilyan started learning the Tamil language formally from a Tamil Pandit named Thirukannapuram Srinivachariar. He started writing Tamil short stories in the Tamil Weekly Sudesamithran and also worked as a reporter in Sudesamithran from 1935 to 1942. Later he became a sub-editor at the English daily newspaper Hindustan Times.

== Work in films ==
During his time at the Hindustan Times he became friends with B N Reddy of Vijaya Studios and V. Nagayya. This bought him into the world of films. He co-wrote the screenplays of films like Swarga Seema (1945) and En Veedu (1953). He later wrote about his film world experiences in his book Cinema Valarndha Kadhai (1985). Later he also produced a documentary titled "Birth of a Newspaper".

== Novels ==
After his stint at the Hindustan Times he returned to work at Sudesamithran and started writing full-length novels. One of his first works was a self-published political novel called Balathkaaram. He also started publishing in other magazines like Amudhasurabi. Paalaivanathu pushpam and Sandha deepam were his earliest historical novels. Sandilyan's most famous novels were serialised in Kumudam, a weekly Tamil magazine and was instrumental in increasing the circulation to a greater extent. He was one of the very few Tamil writers to get a monthly salary from Kumudam for his novels. After leaving Kumudam, he unsuccessfully ran a weekly magazine called Kamalam. His historical novels were published in book form by Vanadhi Padhippagam and became best sellers. As of 2009, many of them still remain in print, four decades after being first published. Kamil Zvelebil once called him as the "fourth most popular Tamil Writer".

== Nationalization Controversy ==
In 2009, The Tamil Nadu Government announced its intention to nationalise Sandilyan's works (along with those of 28 other authors) and provide compensation to his legal heirs. This caused criticism from the legal heirs of Sundara Ramasami and Kannadasan. The Government soon retracted its position saying that the offer was optional and that it would force those who did not want to lose royalty. Sandilyan's legal heirs declined the Government's offer to nationalise and provide solatium.

== Partial bibliography ==
=== Autobiography ===
- Porattangal – போராட்டங்கள் (1978)

=== Biography ===
- Sri Ramanujar – ஸ்ரீ ராமானுஜர்

=== Short Story Collection ===
- Raniyin kanavu – ராணியின் கனவு (1963)

=== Non Fiction ===
- Cinema Valarndha Kadhai – சினிமா வளர்ந்த கதை (1987)
- Kamban Kanda Pengal – கம்பன் கண்ட பெண்கள் (1979)

=== Non-Historical Fiction ===
- Balathkaaram (Puratchi Pen) (1958)
- Shenbaga Thottam
- Manamoham
- Nangooram
- Madhumalar

=== Historical Fiction ===
(45)
- Kadal Pura (கடல் புறா) – III parts (1967)

Chozha Commander Karunagara Pallavan (later became King Thondaiman) heads the invasion of Vijaya (modern-day Malaysia and Singapore) and Kalinga (Modern Orissa). 11th century Chozha Empire.

- Yavana Rani (யவன ராணி) – II parts

Eastern Chozhan army commander's love story set in the back drop of assassination of Ilanchetchenni and his son Karikala Chozhan's struggle to get back his kingdom. 1st century Early Chozha Empire.

- Raja Perigai (ராஜ பேரிகை)
- Mannan Magal (மன்னன் மகள்)
- Kanni Madam (கன்னி மாடம்)

Kannimadam is set in the later part of the 12th century during the reign of Second Rajathi Raja Cholan. It revolves around the family feud in the Pandya dynasty, Sinhalese army's entry into Pandya Nadu at the request of one side, the alleged atrocities of the Sinhalese army and the war between Sinhalese and Chola armies ending with the defeat of the former.

- Rajamuthirai (ராஜமுத்திரை) – II parts
- Alai Arasi (அலை அரசி)
- Avani Sundari (அவனி சுந்தரி)
- Chandarmathi (சந்திரமதி)
- Chithranjani(சித்ரஞ்சனி):Chithranjani was set in the later part of the 1st century A.D. during the reign of Gautamiputra Satakarni. The story revolves around Gautamiputra Satakarni's efforts to check the invasion of Western Kshatrapa's Mahakshatrapa Chashtana.
- Ilaya Rani (இளைய ராணி)
- Indira Kumari (இந்திர குமாரி)
- Jala Deepam (ஜல தீபம்) – III parts (1973)
- Jala Mohini (ஜல மோகினி)
- Jeeva Boomi (ஜீவ பூமி)
- Kadal Rani (கடல் ராணி)
- Kadal Vendhan (கடல் வேந்தன்)
- Madhahaviyin Manam (மதஹவியின் மனம்)
- Malai Arasi (மலை அரசி)
- Malai Vasal (மலை வாசல்)
- Mangaladevi (மங்கலதேவி)
- Manjal aaru (மஞ்சள் ஆறு)
- Manmalar (மண்மலர்): It is the story of Mewar king Rana Pratap who consistently defied the authority of Akbar.
- Masthaani (மஸ்தானி)
- Mohana Silai (மோகனச் சிலை)
- Mohini Vanam (மோகினி வனம்)
- Moongil Kottai (மூங்கில் கோட்டை)
- Naaga Deepam (நாக தீபம்)
- Naaga Devi (நாக தேவி)
- Neel Vizhi (நீள்விழி)
- Nila Mangai (நிலமங்கை)
- Neela Rathi (நீலரதி)
- Neelavalli (நீலவல்லி)
- Pallava Peedam (பல்லவ பீடம்)
- Pallava Thilagam (பல்லவ திலகம்)
- Pandiyan Bavani (பாண்டியன் பவனி)
- Raaniyin Kanavu (ராணியின் கனவு)
- Raja Thilagam (ராஜதிலகம்)
- Raja Yogam (ராஜயோகம்)
- Rajyasree (ராஜ்யஸ்ரீ)
- Rana Hammer (ராணா ஹமீர்)
- Seran Chelvi (சேரன் செல்வி)
- Udhayabanu (உதயபானு)
- Vasantha Kaalam (வசந்தகாலம்)
- Vijaya Mahadevi (விஜய மகாதேவி) – III Parts
- Vilai Raani (விலை ராணி)
- Raja Perigai(ராஜ பேரிகை)

== See also ==
- List of Indian writers
