= Mannan Magal =

Novel by Sandilyan

மன்னன் மகள்
- Author: Sandilyan
- Original title: Mannan Magal
- Language: Tamil
- Genre: Historical novel
- Publisher: Vanathi Pathippagam
- Publication place: India

Mannan Magal (Tamil: மன்னன் மகள், maṉṉaṉ makaḷ, lit. King's Daughter) is a Tamil language historical novel written by Sandilyan. The story is based on ancient Tamil poetry. It is a love story set around 1019 CE, focusing on the Rajendra Chola I#Expedition to the Ganges and politics in the Vengi Kingdom.

== Plot ==
Karikalan begins his journey to find his birth identity, knowing nothing about his parents. He goes to Vengi kingdom and meets Niranchana devi accidentally where he learns about the horrifying political clutches around her and her first younger brother Rajaraja Narendra. The Vengi King Vimaladithyan has three children from his three wives, eldest daughter of Niranchana, first son Rajaraja Narendra of Kundavai - sister of Chola Emperor Rajendra Cholan I, second son of Vishnuvarshan - sister of Jayasimha II. Vengi is in an undeclared war between Niranchana, who wants to strengthen the throne for Rajaraja Narendra against Jayasimha II and seeks to swipe elder and have a stronghold at Vengi with his nephew Vishnuvarshan, so as to stop the Chola invasion and dominance. Karikalan decides to dedicate for Niranchana and her mission. On his journey to save Niranchana Devi and get his own identity he had to deal with Brammaraayar, Jayasimha II, and Araiyan Rajarajan. They eventually fall for one another

The story spreads from Vengi and takes him to his guardian father-figure, Araiyan Rajarajan, who, along with other members, are bound by an oath to no reveal Karikalan's identity. Even though Karikalan was unable to learn his identity, he was treated as a great warrior and due to his wit and intelligence receives a position on the War Council which is headed by Vallavaraiyan Vandiyadevan for the Cholas' Ganges expedition.

Karikalan's foils Araiyan Rajarajan's war strategies for the Cholas to win/cross kingdoms. The Cholas conquered six kingdoms.

== Characters ==
- Karikalan (fictional)
- Niranchana Devi (fictional)
- Sengamala Selvi (fictional)
- Rajendra Chola
- Rajaraja Narendra
- Vallavaraiyan Vandiyadevan
- Araiyan Rajarajan
- Brammaraayar
- Thuravi alias Jeyavarman (fictional)
- Jayasimha II
