= Kalsi =

Kalsi is a surname. Notable people with the surname include:

- Ajay Kalsi, Indian entrepreneur
- Ankit Kalsi, Indian cricketer
- Harkirat Singh Kalsi, Indian road racing cyclist
- Johnny Kalsi, British musician
- Yashpal Singh Kalsi, Indian martial artist
- Saurabh Kalsi, Indian Music Composer, Singer, Songwriter
