= Yashpal Sharma =

Yashpal Sharma may refer to:

- Yashpal Sharma (actor) (born 1967), Indian actor
- Yashpal Sharma (cricketer) (1954–2021), Indian cricketer
