= Kalsi, Dehradun =

Kālsī
- Country: India
- State: Uttarakhand

Population
  - Total: 47,239

Languages
  - Official: Hindi
  - Native: Jaunsari, Sirmauri

Kalsi (Kālsī) is a town in Dehradun District, Uttarakhand. It is known for the Rock edicts of Kalsi, a group of major inscriptions by emperor Ashoka. The Kalsi rock contains the Major Rock Edicts 1 to 14. Due to the complete set, it's sometimes called the standard version of the edict. It's also special for having some outlines of animals and birds. For example, an outline of an elephant depicts Buddha's descent from Tushila heaven.

The Kalsi rock edict of Ashoka No.13, mentions the Greek kings Antiochus, Ptolemy, Antigonus, Magas and Alexander by name, as recipients of his teachings.

== Demographics ==
The sub-district is a part of Jaunsar-Bawar region with the complete population being rural and population of 47,329 with 24,840 males and 22,489 females. The literacy rate of the region was 68.7% as of 2011. The primary language spoken in the sub-district is Jaunsari, along with Hindi. The Scheduled Castes and Scheduled Tribes accounts for 33.23% (15,708 person) and 57.89% (27,463 person) of the total population.
