= Rock edicts of Khalsi =

Circa 250 BCE Indian works by Ashoka

Coordinates: 30.5180°N 77.8482°E

Rock edicts of Kalsi
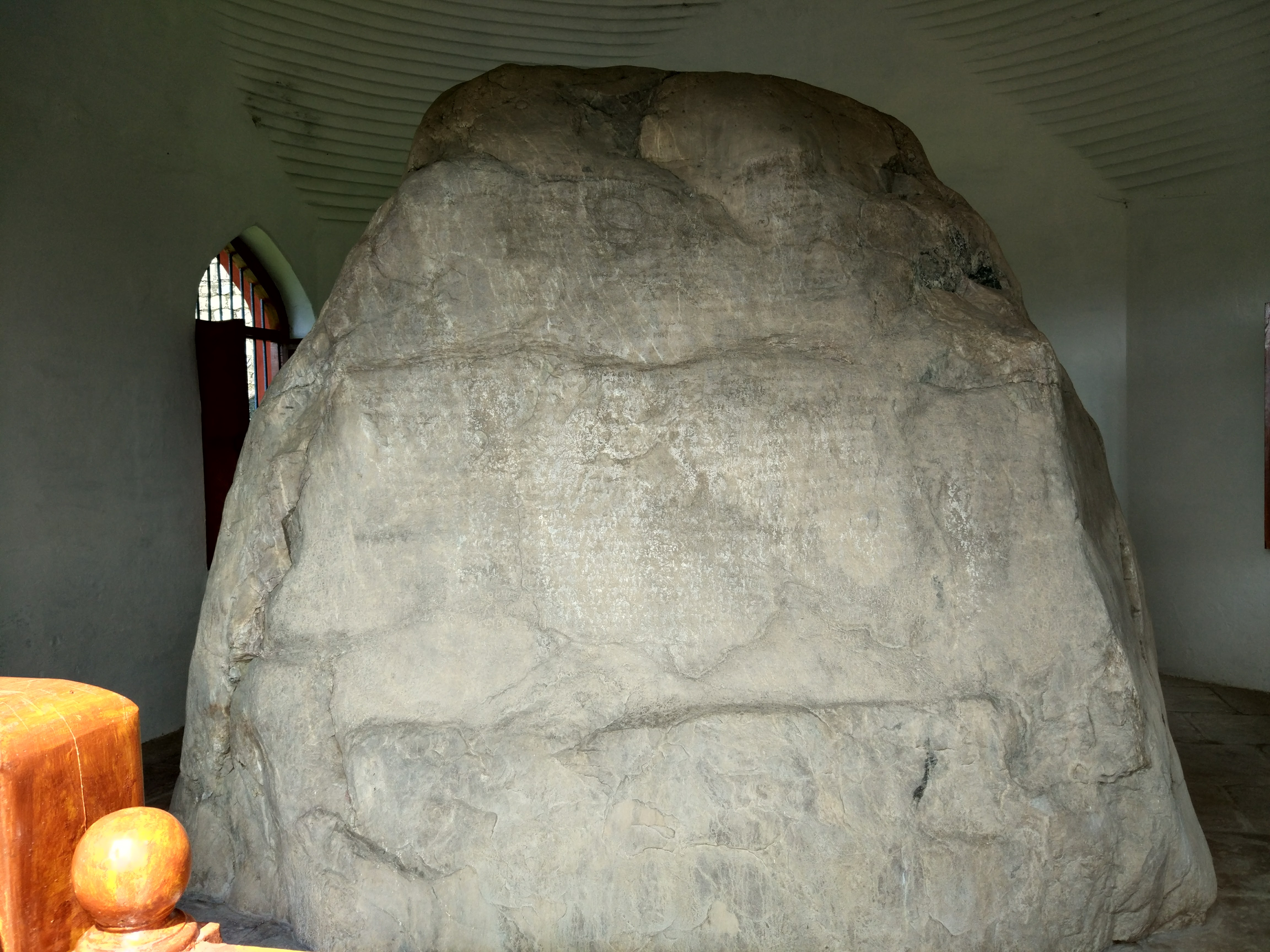
- Rock edicts of Kalsi (Edicts N°1 to 12 and beginning of Edit N°13 of Ashoka on the main face of Kalsi rock).
- Material: Rock
- Writing: Prakrit in Brahmi script
- Created: circa 250 BCE
- Period/culture: Maurya Empire
- Present location: Kalsi, Dehradun District, Uttarakhand, India

Location
- Kālsi (India)

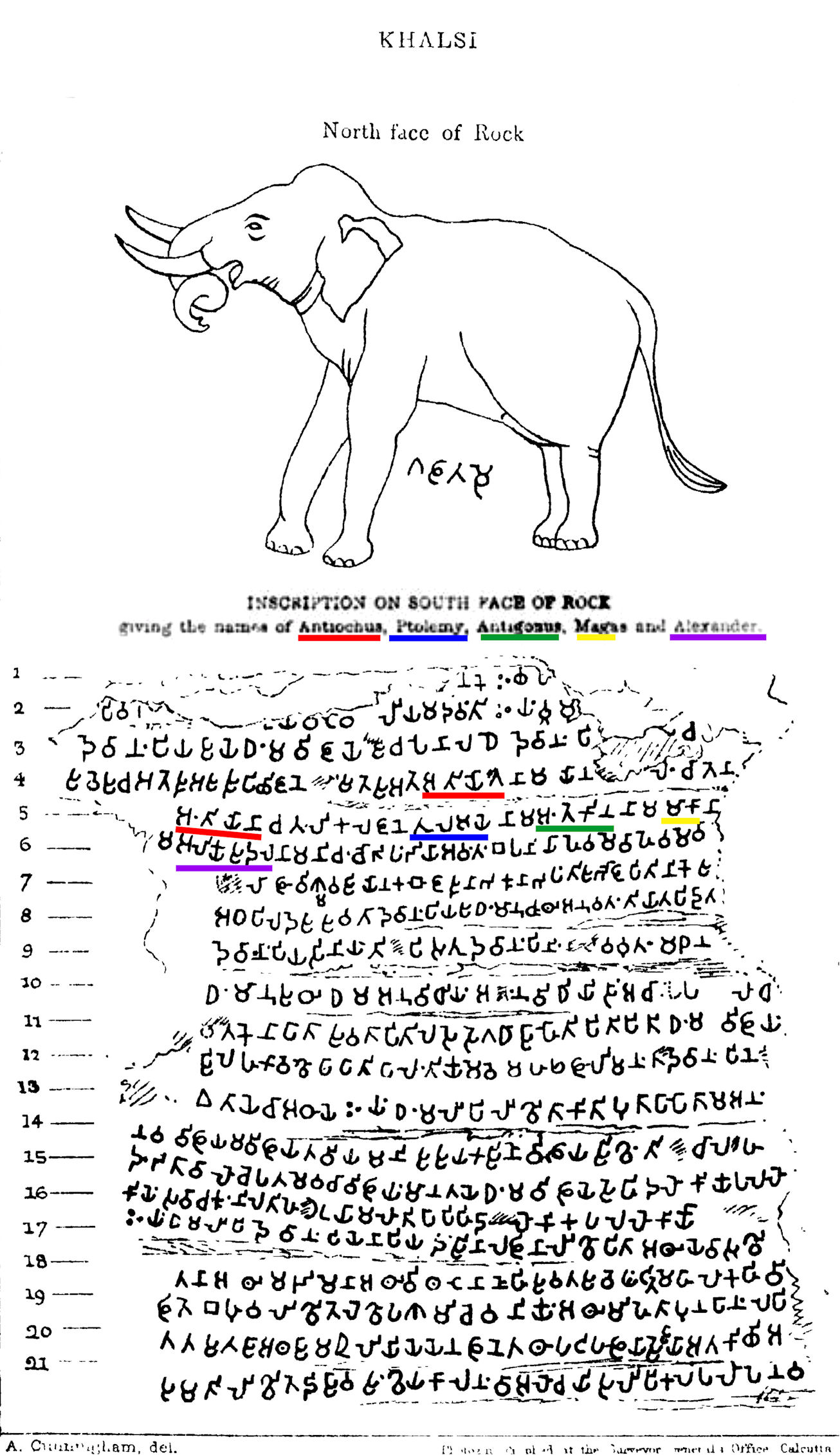
Edict No13 of Ashoka, Kalsi inscription, with the identification of Hellenistic kings Antiochos II, Ptolemy II, Antigonos II Gonatas, Magas of Cyrene and Alexander II of Epirus

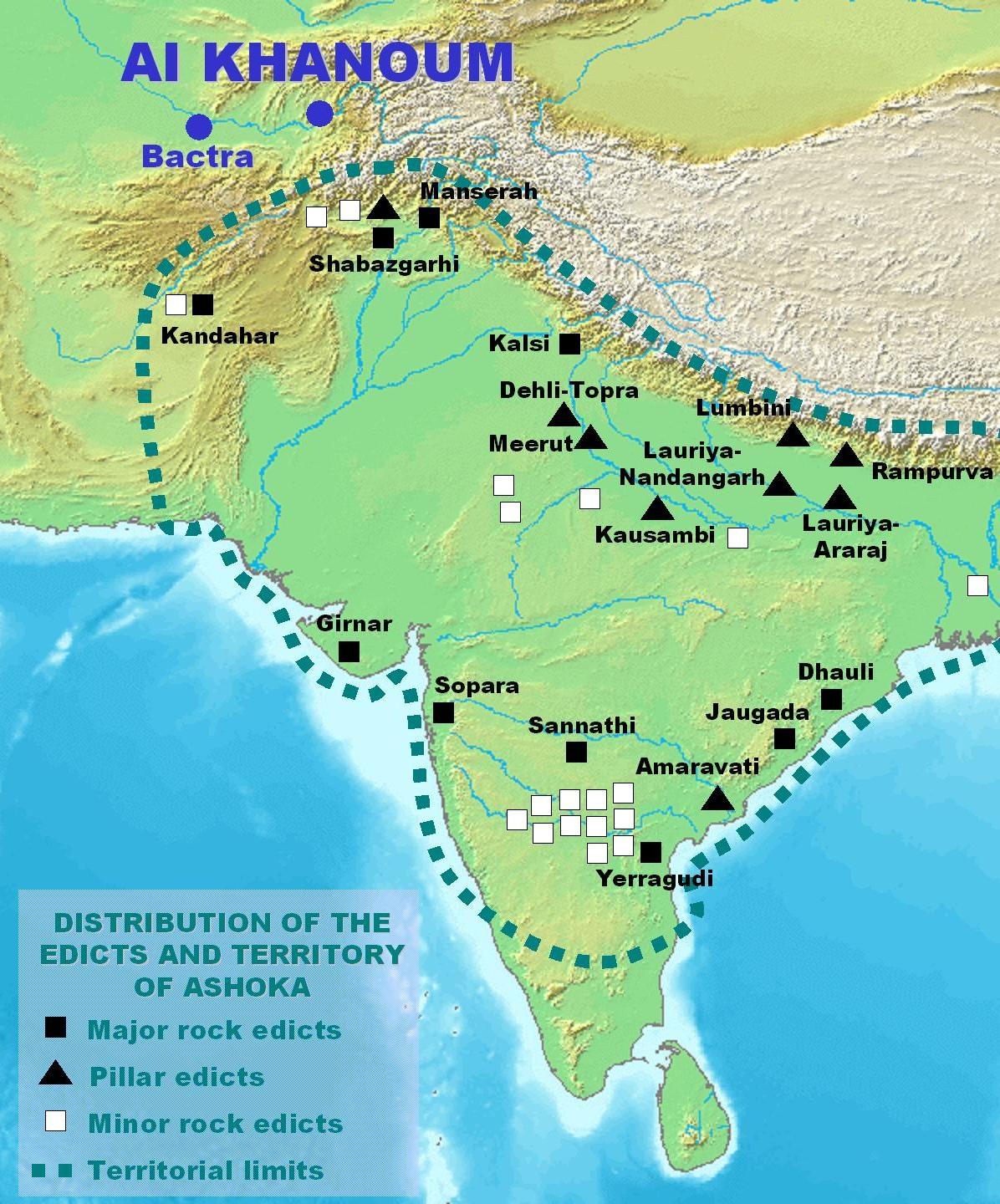
The Kalsi inscription is one of many Edicts of Ashoka, which ultimately cover almost all of his territory.

The Rock edicts of Kālsi (कालसी), is a group of an Indian rock inscriptions written by the Indian Emperor Ashoka around 250 BCE. They contain some of the most important of the Edicts of Ashoka. The inscription in Khalsi contains all the Major Rock Edicts, from 1 to 14. They were discovered in Khalsi, a village in Uttarakhand, northern India, by Alexander Cunningham about 1850.

== The inscription ==
The Rock edicts of Kalsi are among the many inscriptions of Ashoka, the first being the Bilingual inscription of Kandahar, written in Greek and in Aramaic, in the year 10 of his reign. The other inscriptions of Ashoka are in Indian language (various forms of Prakrits) with the exception of the Kandahar Greek Edict of Ashoka, and were only published from around 3 to 4 years later, and until 27 years after his coronation.

The Kalsi edicts, placed in North-Western India, were located near the Hellenistic world represented by the Greco-Bactrian Kingdom and its capital Ai Khanoum. The language of these edicts is Pali and the script is Brahmi.

The inscriptions were written on a solid quartz rock. The main face (east face) of the rock contains Edicts 1 to 12 and the first part of Edict 13. On the right side (north face) is the drawing of an elephant with the word in Brahmi Gajatama, of uncertain meaning, possibly "Supreme Elephant". On the left side (south face) is the continuation of the inscription started on the main face, with the second part of Edict 13 and Edict 14.

This last edict, Edict No.13, is particularly important in that it mentions the main Hellenistic kings of the time, as well as their precise geographical location, suggesting that Ashoka had a very good understanding of the Greek world of the time. It is also this inscription which made it possible to date the reign of Ashoka with a certain precision, between 260 and 230 BCE. This Edict also appears, although in a less well preserved form, in the Girnar inscription, and very damaged in the Mansehra inscription.

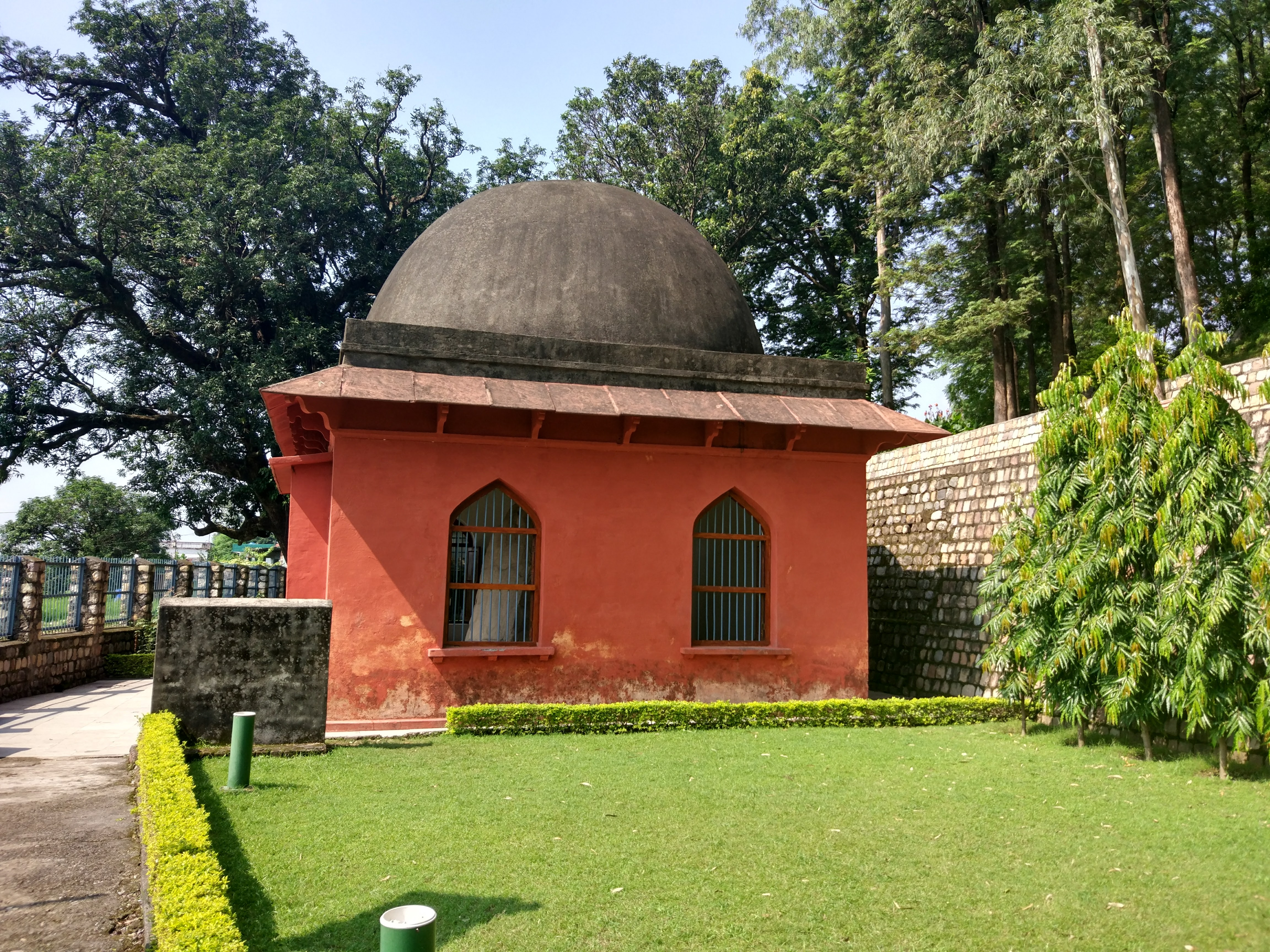
Shelter of the inscription nowadays.

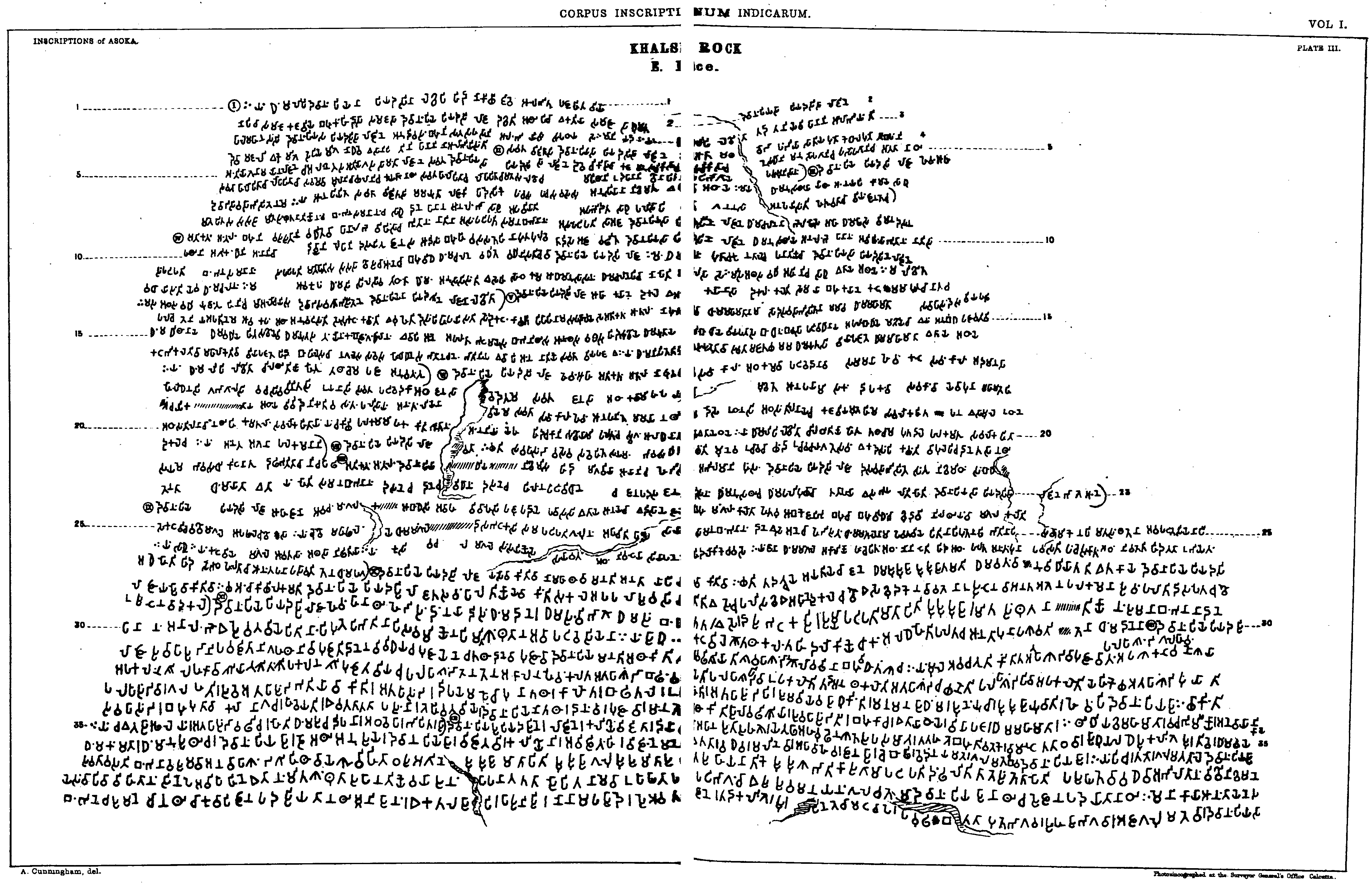
The edicts from 1 to 12, and beginning of edict N°13.

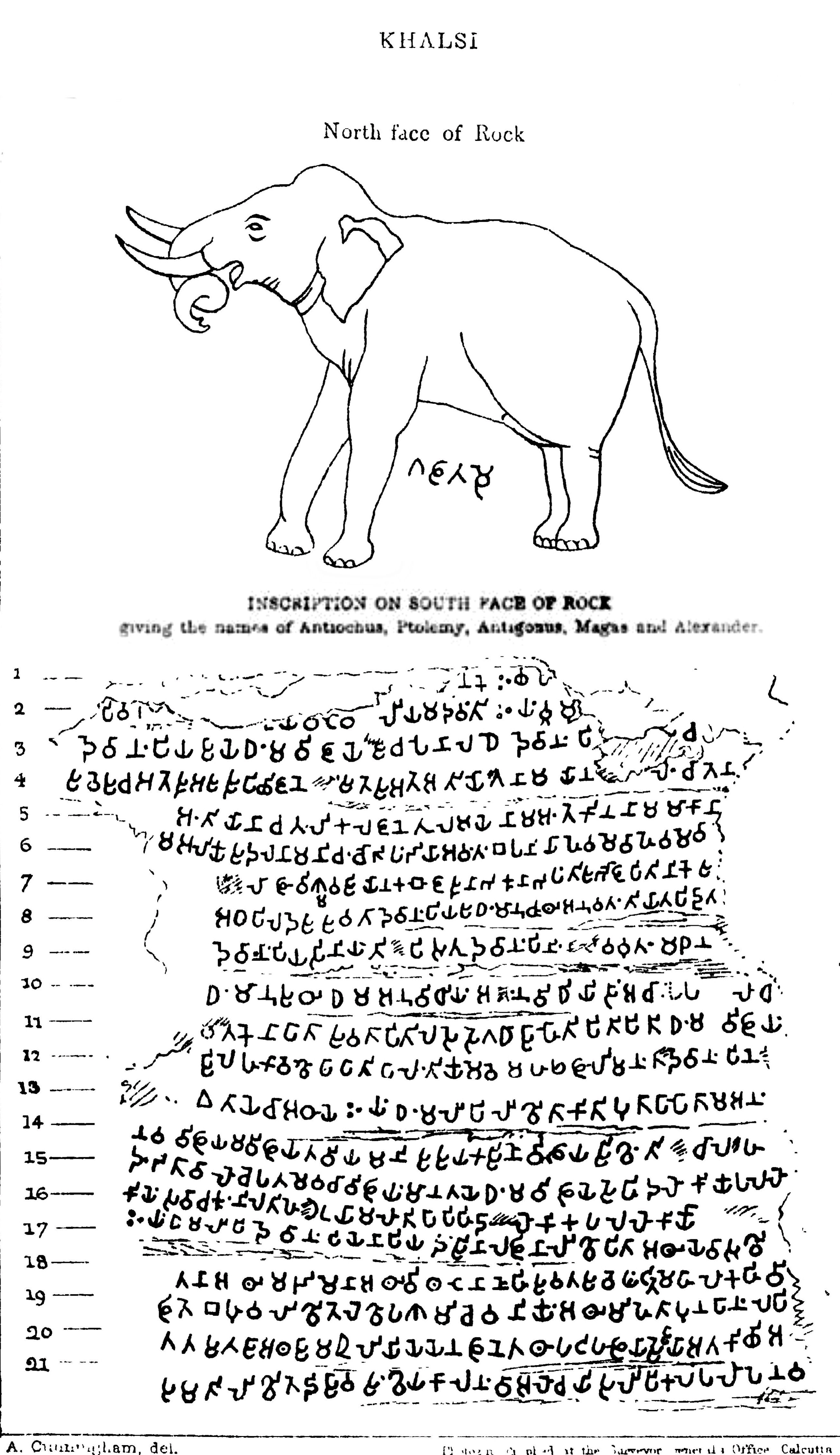
The Elephant motif, and continuation of edict N°13.

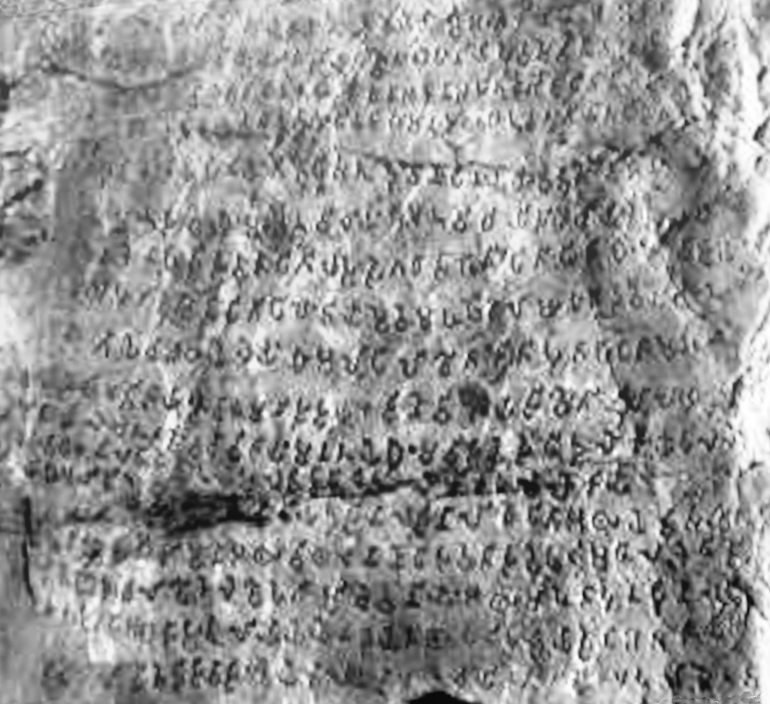
Continuation of Edict No13 of the Kalsi inscription.

Edict 13 refers in particular to contemporary rulers of the Hellenistic period, who had inherited the conquests of Alexander the Great. Its mentions Antiochos II, Ptolemy II, Antigonos II Gonatas, Magas of Cyrene and Alexander II of Epirus.

Now, it is the conquest by the Dharma that the Beloved of the Gods considers as the best conquest. And this one (the conquest by the Dharma) was won here, on the borders, and even 600 leagues from here, where the king Antiochos reigns, and beyond where reign the four kings Ptolemy, Antigonos, Magas and Alexander, likewise in the south, where live the Cholas, the Pandyas, and as far as Tamraparni

— Extract from Edict No.13.

Some scholars believe that Buddhist communities have emerged in the Hellenistic world following Ashoka's reign, notably in Alexandria (this community being mentioned four centuries later by Clement of Alexandria). Given Ashoka's particularly moral definition of "Dharma" it is possible that he simply wants to say that virtue and piety now exist from the Mediterranean to the south of India. An expansion of Buddhism to the West is not fully confirmed historically (see Berenike Buddha and Helgö Buddha). In other inscriptions, Ashoka also states that he sent emissaries to the West to transmit medical care and medicinal plants (Major Rock Edict No.2). We do not know what the influence of these emissaries was on the Greek world.

== Stamping ==
The inscriptions have been remarkably stamped and published by E. Hultzsch in "Inscriptions Of Asoka", the full text of which is available online.

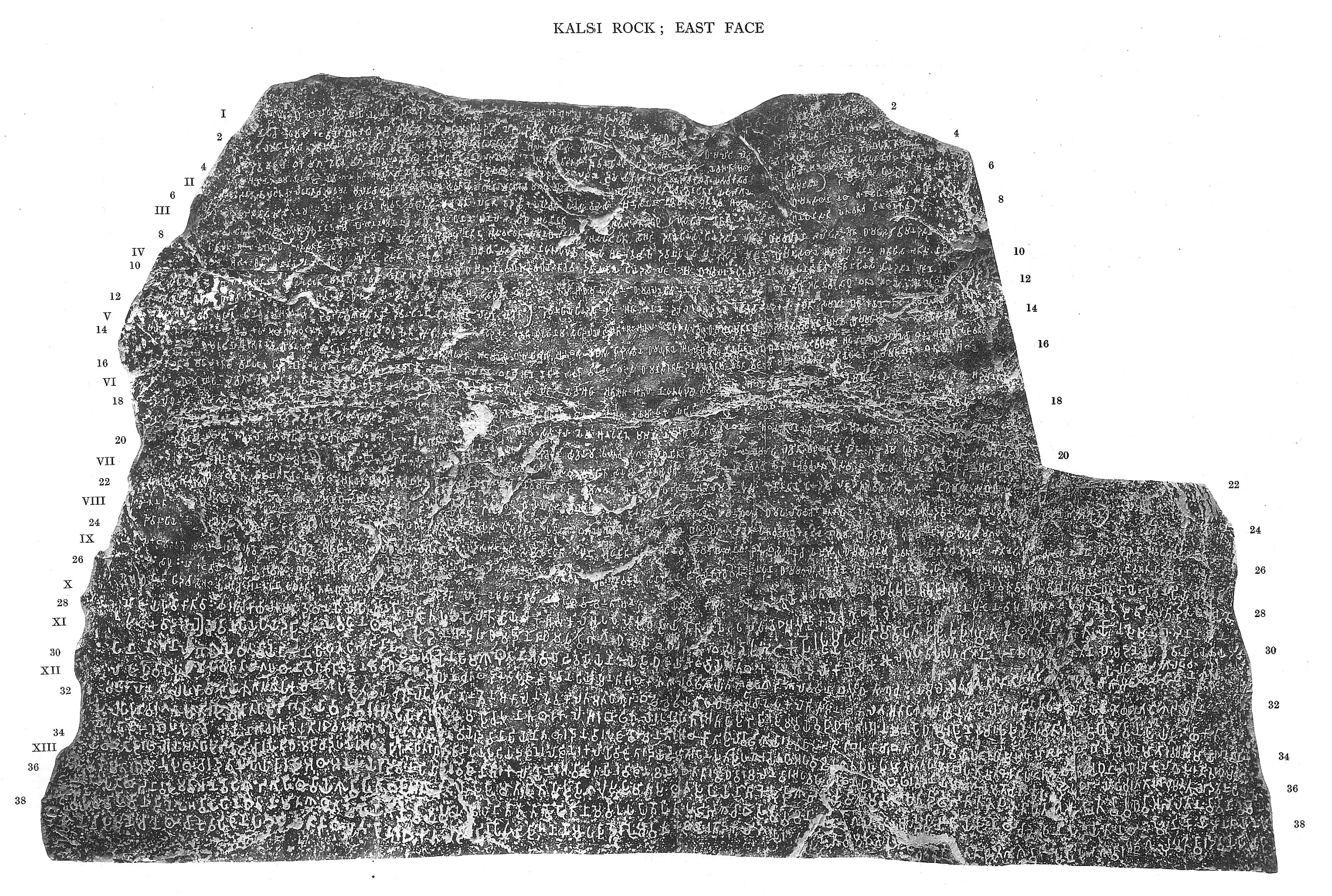
Stamping of the inscription: Edicts from 1 to 12, and beginning of 13.

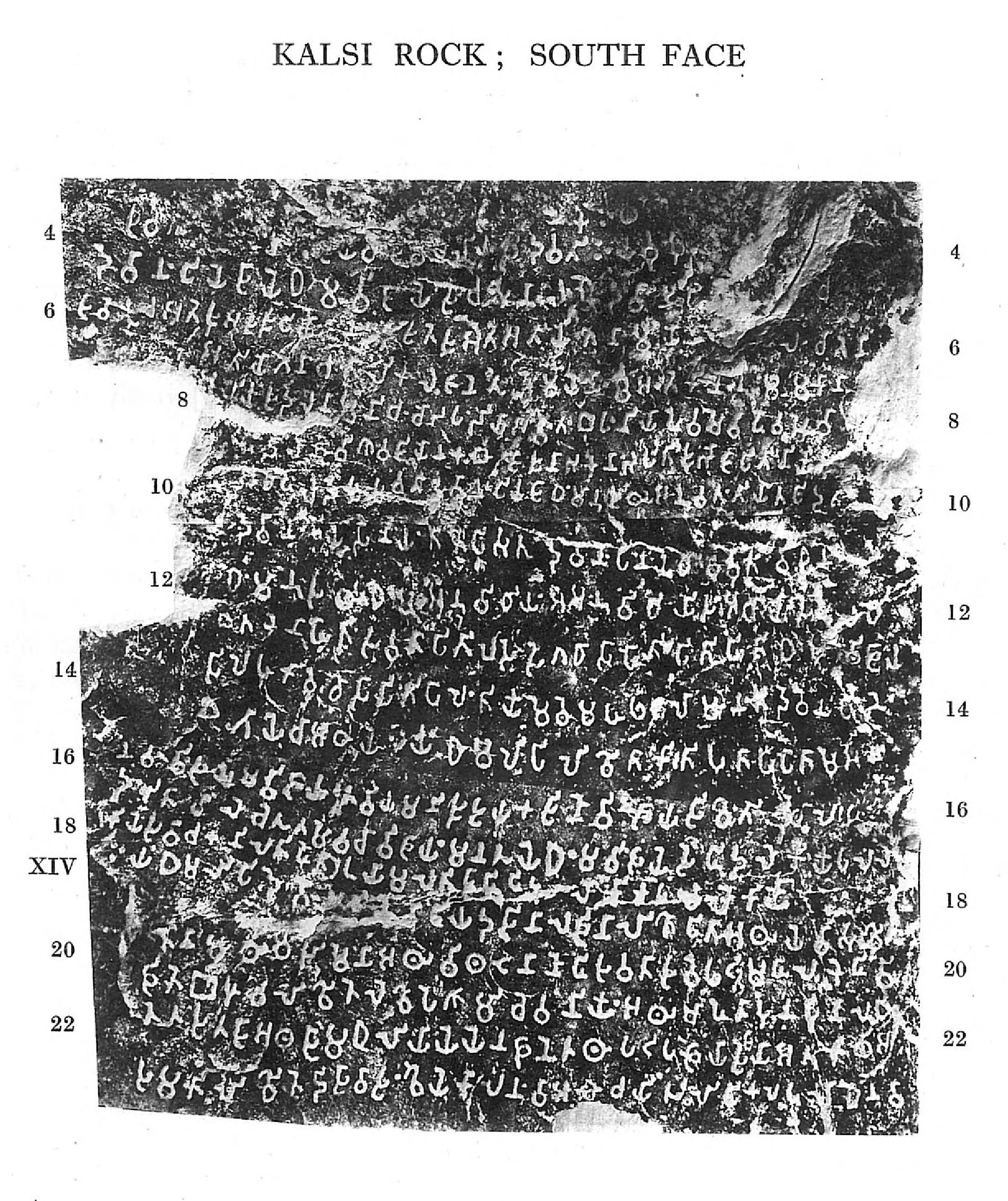
Stamping of the south portion of the inscription. Continuation of Edict 13, and Edict 14.

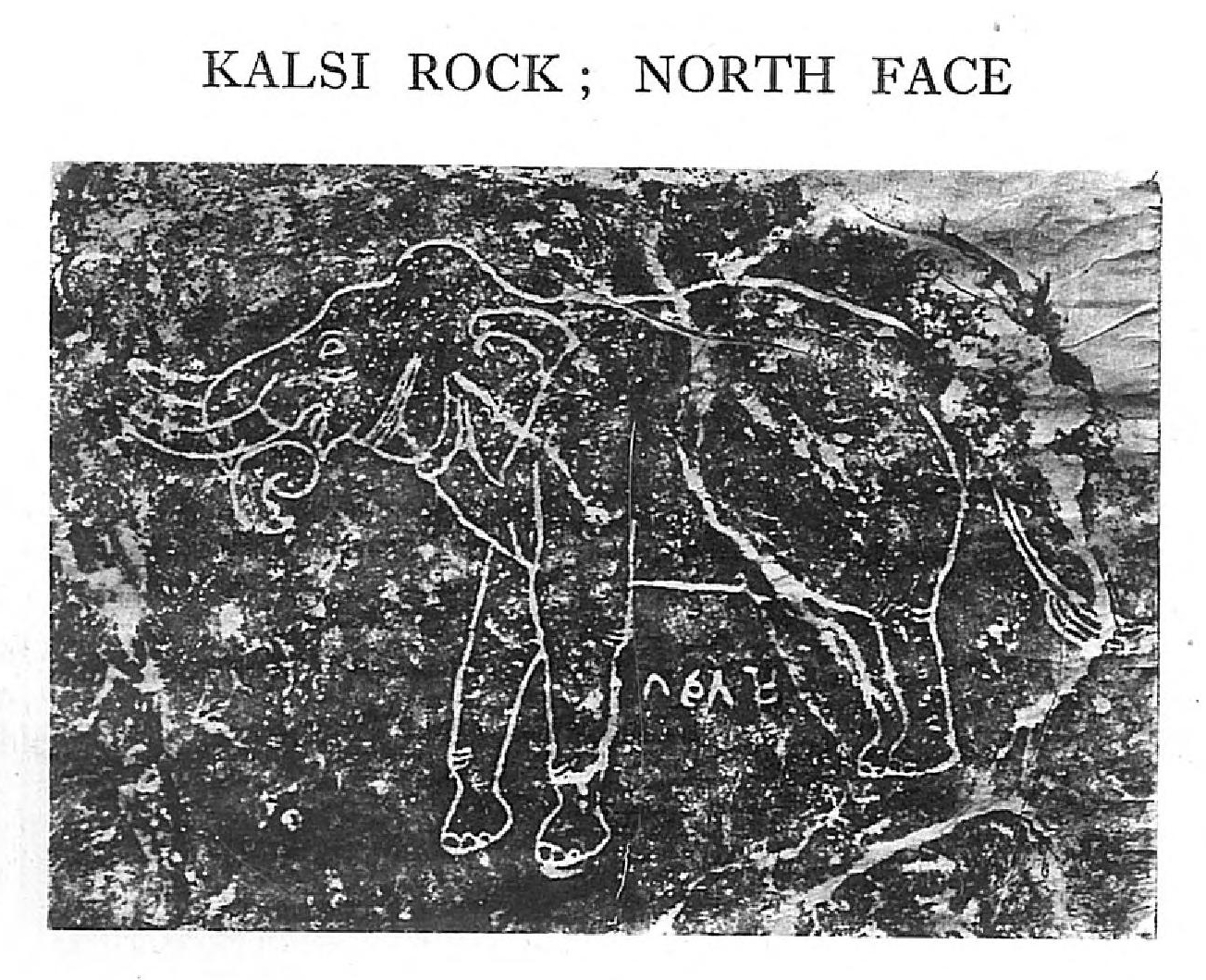
The Elephant.

== Relation to Greek philosophy ==
According to Valeri Yailenko, the Kineas inscription of Ai Khanoum, dated about 300 BCE, probably influenced the writing of the Edicts of Ashoka a few decades later, around 260 BCE (see also Hellenistic influence on Indian art). The edicts put forward moral rules which are extremely close to the Kinéas inscription of Ai Khanoum, both in terms of content and formulation. Short, aphoristic expressions, the subjects being discussed, the vocabulary itself, are all elements of similarity with the inscription of Kineas.

== Sources ==
- Valeri P. Yailenko, Aï Khanoum's delphic maxims and the formation of the Asoka dharma doctrine, Dialogues d'histoire ancienne, volume 16, number 1, 1990, 239-256
