= Yashpal Singh Kalsi =

Indian martial artist

- Born: 23 September 1978 (age 47)
- Awards: US Open Karate Championship

Yashpal Singh Kalsi (born 23 September 1978) is a martial artist from Delhi.

== Black Belt ==
Year	Black Belt Dan	Examiner / Signatory	Authority
1996	Black Belt 1st Dan	Shihan A. B. George	Indian Martial Arts Academy, New Delhi
1999	Black Belt 2nd Dan	Shihan Moses Thilak / Kennei Mabuni	Alan Thilak Karate School International, Chennai
2001	Black Belt 1st Dan	Shihan Per B Mistry	All India Karate Do Federation, Mumbai
2002	Black Belt 3rd Dan	Dai Sensei Moses Thilak	Alan Thilak Karate School International, Chennai
2005	Black belt 2nd Dan	Shihan Pervex B Mistry	All India Karate Do Federation, Chennai
2005	Black Belt 4th Dan	Soke Seiko Suzuki	Seiko Kai International, Japan
2005	Black Belt 4th Dan	Shihan Akira Sato	Seiko Kai International, Vancouver, Canada
2007	Black Belt 4th Dan	Soke Tamas Weber	Sanshinkan Karate International, Sweden
2008	Black belt 5th Dan	Soke Tamas Weber	Sanshinkan Karate International, Sweden
2012	Black Belt 5th Dan	World Karate Federation	World Karate Federation
2013	Black Belt 6th Dan	Soke Tamas Weber	Sanshinkan International, Sweden
2014	Black Belt 6th Dan	World Karate Federation	World Karate Federation
2014	Black Belt 2nd Dan	Bahgat Fatfout	Krav Maga, Israel
2017	Black Belt 7th Dan	Soke Tamas Weber	Sanshinkan International, Sweden

== Early life ==
Yashpal Singh Kalsi was born 23 September 1978 in Delhi to Sikh parents Ram Singh Kalsi and his wife Anamika Singh Kalsi. He took up karate at the age of 8 and soon became captain of his school karate team. He is a karate black belt. He received his first black belt in 1996 and since then he has won medals at state, national and International Karate Championships.

=== Country representation and lineage ===
Started training as a coach at Indian Martial Arts Academy in 1996, under the guidance of Shihan A. B. George.

1999, extended services to All India Martial Art Federation and Martial Art Association of Delhi.

2001, Started working under India’s well-known maser Shihan Dr. Moses Thilak, who was a direct lineage of master Kenei Mabuni.

2004, Soke Yuriy Kostrov, Grandmaster of Agni Kenpo appointed Yashpal Singh as the representative of Kenpo Karate in India.

After Mr. Thilak’s demise. in 2004, Mr Kalsi pursued Itosu Kai karate under Grandmaster Saadaki Sakagami from Japan.

In 2006 Shihan Akira Sato and Soke Seiko Suzuki from Japan appointed Mr. Singh, as country administrator of Seiko Kai Asia.

2007, Soke Tamas Weber appointed Yashpal Singh Kalsi as Chief of Sanshinkan Karate in South Asia till now.

== Coaching career ==
Yashpal Singh Kalsi, is founding member of All India Mixed Martial Arts Federation, and as of 2015 was the head of the Delhi branch India Mixed Martial Arts Association.

Singh Kalsi is a WKF certified Karate and Mixed Martial Arts trainer and has students from India, Greece, U.S.A, Chile, Malaysia, South Africa, Afghanistan, Pakistan, Nepal, the UK, and many other places. He is also qualified in Brazilian jiu-jitsu. His students have represented India in international tournaments and world championships. Since 2007, he has been chief trainer at Sanshinkan International, a Swedish martial arts school based in Gurgaon, and heads its centres across India. The chain trains both men and women; Singh Kalsi works alongside his wife, Anamika Singh Kalsi.

=== Karate ===
Singh Kalsi is a WKF (world Karate Federation) certified Karate coach. Holds Black Belt 6th Dan from World Karate Federation and 7th Dan from Sanshinkan International. He has trained the top players from India, Since 2007, These players still are representing in the world and International championships. Mr. Singh was appointed as official coach of the National Karate Team in the following international championships.

2011 - Karate World Cup Malaysia

2013 – Youth Cup, Croatia

2016 – US Open, Las Vegas

2017 – US Open, Las Vegas

2018 – US Open, Las Vegas

Yashpal was recently appointed as an examiner for Indian special forces. He trained and examined the combat Wing of the Indo-Tibetan Border Police

=== Mixed martial arts ===
Yashpal Singh Kalsi, is founding member of All India Mixed Martial Arts Federation and Global Authority of Mixed Martial Arts Federations. He is a trained and qualified international MMA referee by, International Mixed Martial Arts Federation

As of 2015 was the head of the Delhi branch India Mixed Martial Arts Association. He trains Mixed Martial Arts. He is a head coach to some of the best MMA fighters from India Seth Rosario, Priyanka Jeet Toshi, Lipika Uniyal and Sandeep Yadav.

He is also a MMA judge and senior referee in the Super Fight League.

He has provided training to India's elite force, the Black Cat Commandos, and continuously works with the State Police.

== Grappling ==
Mr. Kalsi was the first official coach of Grappling Federation of India. He trained the Indian athletes for the Grappling world cup at Moscow for Cadet Veteran and Junior august 2015. Our Junior team won 2nd place.

2016 Mr. Kalsi was a referee in the World Grappling championship at Minsk.

=== Self defense ===
Yashpal Singh is well known for his expertise in self defense. He has trained and empow\ered more than 100,000 Indian women. Yashpal Singh’s wife Anamika is a Black belt 6th Dan she work along with him. The couple are authors of the first book ever written on self defense in India Self Defense and You.

== First Indian karate coach to train in Africa, Europe and Canada ==
Singh is the first Indian to get invited in 2011 and train in South Africa.

Yashpal Singh Kalsi also trained in some parts of Europe and interviewed in radio and magazines.

In 2018, Just after winning the US Open Karate Championship he was invited to Canada by Shihan Akira Sato for the exchange program.

== Awards and recognition ==
Yashpal won a medal for India in the Swedish Open Karate Championship in 2013. He won a gold medal in the US Open Karate Championship in 2016. He won two bronze medals in the US Open Karate Championship in 2017.

Year 2018 Yashpal Singh Kalsi won gold medal in US open along with his wife Anamika Singh Kalsi.
