= Samrat Ashok Technological Institute =

Government-aided autonomous engineering college in Vidisha, India

- सम्राट अशोक अभियांत्रिकीय संस्थान
- Motto: योगः कर्मसु कौशलम्
- Motto in English: Excellence in action is yoga
- Type: Grant-in-aid autonomous engineering college
- Established: 1 November 1960; 66 years ago
- Affiliations: Rajiv Gandhi Proudyogiki Vishwavidyalaya; Barkatullah University; AICTE-approved
- Chairman: Jyotiraditya Scindia (Board of Governors)
- Director: Y. K. Jain
- Students: about 2,700
- Location: Vidisha, Madhya Pradesh, India
- Campus: 85 acres (34 ha)
- Website: www.satiengg.in

Samrat Ashok Technological Institute (SATI, also called SATI Vidisha) is a government-aided autonomous engineering college in Vidisha, Madhya Pradesh, India. It was established on 1 November 1960 by the Maharaja Jiwajirao Education Society with a donation from the Gangajali Trust Fund of the Scindia family, and is funded by the Government of Madhya Pradesh. The society and the institute's Board of Governors are chaired by Jyotiraditya Scindia.

The institute began with three engineering branches and about 120 admissions a year; it now offers Bachelor of Technology programmes in eleven disciplines, postgraduate programmes in engineering, computer applications, management and applied chemistry, and doctoral research. Its academic autonomy dates from 2010–11 (granted by RGPV) and 2015–16 (UGC). Among its alumni are Nobel Peace Prize laureate Kailash Satyarthi, Padma Shri recipient V. K. Chaturvedi, and educationist P. B. Sharma.

== History ==
=== Foundation ===
SATI was set up under the Government of India's "Open Door" policy for technical education, with the Gangajali Trust Fund donation of the Scindias—the former rulers of Gwalior State—and commitments of recurring and non-recurring grants from the central and state governments. After the first five years the Government of Madhya Pradesh agreed to meet the institute's entire budget deficit. The institute credits Maharaja Jiwajirao Scindia as its founder.

The foundation stone was laid by Prime Minister Jawaharlal Nehru on 13 February 1962, and the institute was inaugurated by President Rajendra Prasad. It opened with Civil, Mechanical and Electrical Engineering, with a combined intake of 120 students a year. Staff later created merit awards in memory of its founder-principal, V. V. Natu.

=== Name ===
The institute is named after the Mauryan emperor Ashoka. According to Buddhist tradition, Ashoka married Devi, the daughter of a Vidisha merchant, and their children Mahendra and Sanghamitta are said to have carried Buddhism to Sri Lanka. Vidisha, historically also known as Bhelsa, lies close to the Buddhist monuments at Sanchi, the Udayagiri Caves and the Heliodorus pillar.

=== Affiliation and autonomy ===
SATI was first affiliated to Vikram University, Ujjain, along with three other regional engineering colleges: MACT Bhopal (now MANIT), Shri G. S. Institute of Technology and Science, Indore, and MITS Gwalior. After the University of Bhopal (now Barkatullah University) was created, it moved there along with MACT and GEC Bhopal, and in 1998 it became part of the newly established Rajiv Gandhi Proudyogiki Vishwavidyalaya (RGPV), Bhopal.

The institute has since been granted autonomy by three bodies:

- RGPV, by a letter dated 7 January 2011, effective from the 2010–11 session;
- the University Grants Commission, by a letter dated 1 May 2015, effective from 2015–16; and
- Barkatullah University, by a letter dated 9 July 2015.

The institute states that it is preparing to implement the National Education Policy 2020 through a flexible curriculum that lets students choose electives.

=== Quality-improvement programmes ===
SATI was one of five institutions in Madhya Pradesh in the second phase of the World Bank-assisted Technical Education Quality Improvement Programme (TEQIP-II, 2010–17), with a project cost of ₹10 crore. By December 2016 it had spent about 99% of the funds released to it, and it met seven of eight national performance indicators at the sixth joint review mission. It was subsequently selected for TEQIP-III, which the institute says brought financial assistance of ₹15 crore.

== Governance ==
The institute is managed by the Maharaja Jiwajirao Education Society, and its Board of Governors is chaired by Jyotiraditya Scindia. The board includes representatives of the Government of Madhya Pradesh, AICTE, the UGC and RGPV, along with a faculty nominee, members of the Scindia family and the director. The director is Y. K. Jain. An Internal Quality Assurance Cell (IQAC) coordinates quality-enhancement work in line with NAAC guidelines.

== Campus ==
The 85-acre campus lies in the Civil Lines area of Vidisha, a short walk from Vidisha railway station on the Delhi–Mumbai and Delhi–Chennai trunk routes, about 54 km by rail from Bhopal, the nearest airport city. It has separate zones for academic buildings, staff housing, hostels and sports.

Library and computing

The central library holds more than 75,000 volumes and subscribes to 105 national journals and magazines. It runs an open-access system and an online public access catalogue, belongs to the INFLIBNET and e-ShodhSindhu consortia and the National Digital Library of India, and offers about 2,500 NPTEL lecture videos across the campus network. The institute reports roughly 800 computers and a 1 Gbps National Knowledge Network lease line.

Hostels

There are three boys' hostels (Indira Gandhi, Jawaharlal Nehru and R. N. Tagore; about 300 seats) and two girls' hostels (Kalpana Chawla and Gajra Raje; about 220 seats). Messes are run cooperatively by residents under warden supervision.

Other facilities

The campus has the Kailash Satyarthi Auditorium (named for the alumnus and Nobel laureate), a guest house, an Alumni Transit Home built with alumni contributions, a dispensary, a cooperative store, a canteen, a State Bank of India branch with ATM, a Central Bank of India branch and a post office.

Sports

Grounds and courts include cricket, football and hockey fields, a running track, tennis and basketball courts, a skating ring, badminton courts, a games hall and a gymnasium. The Shrimant Madhav Rao Scindia Sports Complex houses badminton and table-tennis facilities, a gym, volleyball courts and chess boards.

== Academics ==
=== Admissions ===
B.Tech. admissions are made through online counselling run by the Directorate of Technical Education, Madhya Pradesh, on the basis of JEE Main merit. In addition to regular seats, 5% extra seats are available under a tuition-fee-waiver scheme, 10% for economically weaker students, and 10% for diploma holders entering the second year (lateral entry). M.Tech. admission is by GATE score or merit, and MCA and MBA admissions go through state counselling.

=== Undergraduate programmes ===
For 2026–27 the institute's fee schedule lists five grant-in-aid B.Tech. programmes (Civil, Mechanical, Electronics & Instrumentation, Electrical, and Computer Science & Engineering) and six self-financed ones (Electronics & Communication, Internet of Things, Artificial Intelligence & Data Science, Agricultural Engineering, Information Technology, and Computer Science & Engineering in Blockchain). Intakes reported in the 2022 prospectus (780 seats in total) were:

- Civil Engineering – 60
- Mechanical Engineering – 120
- Electrical Engineering – 60
- Electronics & Instrumentation – 60
- Electronics & Communication – 60
- Computer Science & Engineering – 120
- Information Technology – 60
- Internet of Things – 60
- Artificial Intelligence & Data Science – 60
- CSE (Blockchain) – 60
- Agricultural Engineering – 60

The Computer Science and Engineering department, set up in the late 1980s, absorbed the Information Technology programme (started in 2000) in 2017–18. The Blockchain programme was introduced in 2021 as CSE (IoT and Cybersecurity with Blockchain Technology) and later renamed. The IoT and AI & Data Science programmes were added in 2020. Biomedical and petrochemical engineering were later merged into Electronics & Instrumentation and Mechanical Engineering respectively.

=== Postgraduate programmes ===
- M.Tech. in Construction Technology & Management, Environmental Engineering and Transportation Engineering (Civil); Advanced Production Systems (Mechanical); Power Electronics (Electrical); and Computer Science & Engineering
- Master of Computer Applications (MCA)
- Master of Business Administration (MBA) and Bachelor of Business Administration (BBA) through the Department of Management Studies
- M.Sc. in Applied Chemistry, offered through the Department of Applied Science (Engineering Physics, Applied Chemistry and Applied Mathematics)

=== Research ===
SATI is an approved Ph.D. research centre of RGPV and Barkatullah University, and an AICTE Quality Improvement Programme (QIP) centre for Ph.D. study in Civil, Mechanical, Electrical, Computer Science and Information Technology. The institute's SATI Journal of Science & Technology is published by its Vigyan-Takniki Parishad (science and technology council). The 2022 prospectus lists nine centres for innovative learning, including:

- Cost-Effective Building Materials & Construction Techniques; Advanced Geopolymer Concrete & its Products; and the Ramanujan Design Centre (Civil Engineering)
- Additive Manufacturing Lab (Mechanical Engineering)
- Embedded Design & Simulation Lab (Electrical Engineering)
- LabVIEW Academy and Virtual Instrumentation & IoT (Electronics Engineering)
- AI & Machine Learning Centre (Computer Science & Engineering)
- Non-Violence & Peace in Education (Humanities & Management)

=== Accreditation ===
- NAAC: accredited in March 2016 (grade B, according to the institute's submission to the council); the institute states it was re-accredited for a further five years, valid up to 21 March 2027.
- NBA: four B.Tech. programmes were accredited by the National Board of Accreditation under its Tier-I (Washington Accord) system—Civil and Computer Science & Engineering (valid up to 30 June 2024), and Mechanical and Electronics & Instrumentation (valid up to 30 June 2025), as stated by the institute.

== Training and placement ==
The Training & Placement Cell arranges pre-placement talks, mock interviews, internships and industry sessions, and provides recruiters with a smart classroom, conference rooms and video-conferencing facilities. For 2022–23 the institute reported 446 eligible students, 35 campus drives and 230 job offers, with a highest package of ₹9 lakh and an average of ₹5.16 lakh per annum. Offers by programme that year were:

Campus placements, 2022–23 (institute figures)
Programme	Companies visiting	Offers
Computer Science	17	77
Electronics & Communication	20	38
Mechanical Engineering	10	37
Electrical Engineering	10	22
MBA	8	17
Electronics & Instrumentation	5	17
MCA	2	16
M.Sc.	1	5
Civil Engineering	1	1

Recruiters named in institute documents include TCS, Capgemini, Hexaware, Cummins India and Tata Motors.

== Industry links and start-ups ==
The institute hosts an AICTE-funded IDEA Lab and a start-up cell that offers pre-incubation support, encourages participation in hackathons such as the Smart India Hackathon, and is a partner institute in the REC programme of the Sidbi Innovation and Incubation Centre at IIT Kanpur. Memoranda of understanding listed in the 2022 prospectus include those with the Engineers Confederation of India (incubation centre, 2017), the Construction Industry Development Council (2017), Louisiana Tech University's Trenchless Technology Center (2020), the National Highways Authority of India (2020), the Madhya Pradesh Council of Science and Technology (2020) and the Police Training & Research Institute, Bhopal (2022).

== Student life ==
=== Clubs and societies ===
The institute asks students to join at least two of its clubs, whose activities count towards a general-proficiency component in the final year. They cover social service, photography, dramatics, speaking and skills, art and literature, sports and yoga, cyber and coding, student counselling, and eco and rural technology, together with student chapters of professional bodies. Named student groups described in the 2024–25 placement brochure include the music club Swar, the dance crew Rudras, the robotics club Flux, the dramatics club Udaan, the photography club Mirage, an entrepreneurship cell and a cyber and coding club.

=== Festivals ===
The annual cultural festival Samrat Utsav and the technical festival Technovision are each held over three days, the latter featuring robotics races, coding contests and discussions on environment and energy. The 2026 edition of Technovision was themed "Innovations for a Sustainable Future".

=== NCC, NSS and sports ===
The institute's NCC unit (attached to the 14 MP Battalion) admits 100 cadets a year, and its NSS unit has 100 volunteers; the 2024–25 brochure notes the selection of NSS volunteers for the Ek Bharat Shreshtha Bharat programme. The institute hosts the Shrimant Madhav Rao Scindia state-level inter-engineering-college cricket tournament, held in memory of Madhavrao Scindia.

=== Alumni association ===
An alumni association was founded in 1986 during the institute's silver jubilee; membership is compulsory for students, and local chapters exist in several cities. An Alumni Coordination Committee maintains links, and alumni meets are held periodically.

== Notable alumni ==
The institute's own lists of "prominent alumni" give the following graduating years and branches.

Name	Graduated	Known for
Kailash Satyarthi	1974, Electrical Engineering	Children's-rights activist; co-recipient of the 2014 Nobel Peace Prize; later taught at the institute for two years
V. K. Chaturvedi	1965, Mechanical Engineering	Former chairman and managing director, Nuclear Power Corporation of India; Padma Shri (2001)
P. B. Sharma	1969, Mechanical Engineering	Founder vice-chancellor of RGPV and of Delhi Technological University; vice-chancellor of Amity University, Gurgaon; president of the Association of Indian Universities from 2017
Pratap Bhanu Sharma	Mechanical Engineering	Member of the Lok Sabha for Vidisha (1980–89); Indian National Congress candidate for Vidisha in 2024
Koppu Sadashiv Murthy	1988, Electrical Engineering	Chairman and managing director of Bharat Heavy Electricals Limited since 1 November 2023

== See also ==
- List of institutions of higher education in Madhya Pradesh
- Vidisha
