= Ashok Jhunjhunwala =

Indian academic

- Born: 22 June 1953 (age 73); Kolkata, India
- Education: IIT Kanpur, University of Maine
- Awards: Padma Shri (2002)
- Scientific career
- Fields: Electrical Engineering and Telecommunications
- Workplaces: IIT Madras Research Park, Department of Electrical Engineering, IIT Madras, TeNeT Group
- Website: https://respark.iitm.ac.in/

Ashok Jhunjhunwala (born 22 June 1953) is an Indian academic and innovator. He received his B.Tech. (Electrical Engineering) from the Indian Institute of Technology, Kanpur and PhD from the University of Maine. He has been a faculty member at the Indian Institute of Technology Madras since 1981. He is the President of IIT Madras Research Park and Chairman of International Institute of Information Technology, Hyderabad. During his career, he has contributed extensively to technology innovation and adoption in the Indian context.

== Early life ==
Ashok Jhunjhunwala was born in Kolkata on 22 June 1953 in a Marwari family. His grandfather was a Gandhian and a close associate of Vinoba Bhave, working with Mahatma Gandhi.

He studied in St Lawrence High School in Kolkata (formerly Calcutta) in India, completing the Higher Secondary examination in 1970. He did his B.Tech degree from IIT Kanpur and MS and PhD from University of Maine, USA and was a faculty member at Washington State University.

== Academic career ==
Prof. Ashok Jhunjhunwala’s first appointment was in Washington State University, USA from 1979 to 1980. Prof. Jhunjhunwala then joined IIT Madras in 1981 in the Department of Electrical Engineering. His research areas include Optical Communication, Computer Networks, Wireless Communication, Decentralized(DC) Solar and Electric Vehicles, where he has significantly contributed in various dimensions.

Over the last few decades he has looked at cost and affordability of various components of the telecommunications and the Internet network, especially in the Indian context. He has worked on techniques to enable communication networks to reach remote parts of rural India. In recent times, he has made some significant contributions in Solar-DC and in battery systems for Electric Vehicles. He has guided more than 70 M.S. and Ph.D. students.

Over the course of his career Jhunjhunwala has served as Chairman and member of various government committees. He has been on boards of several private companies and educational institutions in the country. He was on the boards of the State Bank of India, Bharat Electronics Ltd, Hindustan Teleprinters Limited, NRDC, Institute for Development and Research in Banking Technology (IDRBT), VSNL and BSNL as well as Tata Communications, Mahindra Electric, Sasken, Tejas Networks, Tata Teleservices Maharashtra Ltd, Intellect and Exicom. As of 2020 he is on the board of Biotechnology Industry Research Assistance Council (BIRAC), Chairman of IIITH and is the Chairman of Technology Advisory Committee of SEBI. In 2017 - 18, Jhujhunwala was on sabbatical from IITM, serving as the Principal Advisor to the Ministry of Power in the Government of India, and the Ministry of Railways in the Government of India, New Delhi.

== Contributions in technology innovation and adoption ==
=== Industry-Academia Intervention and Incubation ===
When Dr. Jhunjhunwala joined IIT Madras in 1981, as an academician he observed that there was not enough interaction between industry and academic institutions. Industries did not invest in R&D of their own and preferred to import knowledge and technology. This resulted in unaffordable products and services which were available to only a section of the society. He recognized that if products and services were to be used by the bulk of Indian Society they had to be made affordable. His idea was to develop technology in-house by mutual participation of both academia and industry. To further this objective Dr. Jhunjhunwala initiated the setting up of the IITM Research Park, adjacent to the IITM campus. The 1.2 million sqft space today has about 60 R&D centres of industries, working closely with IITM, thus creating an eco-system where faculty, students and industry professionals interact in a formal and informal manner. He believes that such interaction is the key to technological innovations and entrepreneurship. Prof Jhunjhunwala's approach of collaboration with industry has resulted in development and adoption of technology at the grass-roots level.

=== Innovation in Telecom Networks ===
In the mid 90's his work on development of the corDECT Wireless Local Loop (WLL) allowed India to move to wireless communication systems at much lower cost. Both the capital and operational cost were significantly lower than those of any technologies prevalent at that point of time. corDECT enables wireless access solution for telecom networks with integration of both voice and Internet services. He was conferred the Padma Shri in 2002 for his work on Wireless Communication Systems.

His other initiatives like setting up of the Centre for Excellence in Wireless Technology (CEWiT) and the Telecom Standards Development Society of India (TSDSI) have enabled India to export IPR in telecom.

=== Innovation in Electric Vehicles ===
Since 2016, Prof Jhunjhunwala is leading the efforts of bringing EVs in the country. He mentors several startups and groups to develop new batteries and EV models. He aims to make Electric Vehicles affordable. This will reduce India's import bill of oil and promote a greener technology.

He has come up with various innovations such as reducing the size of batteries, battery swapping, using environment friendly zero–effluent recycling of spent Li-ion batteries which have resulted in significant enhancements in energy efficiencies of EVs.

=== Innovation in Solar Decentralization ===
Since about 2010, Dr Jhunjhunwala has focused his research on the power problems of India which affect the masses. He developed solar roof-top and DC power-line at home along with the use of DC-powered appliances as an answer to these problems. This innovative technique reduces power consumption.

== Awards and honours ==
- Padma Shri, India, 2002: distinguished service in science and engineering, telecommunications
- Chairman of the CSIR Advisory Board
- Dr.Vikram Sarabhai Research Award, India, 1997: towards the contributions and achievements in the field of Electronics, Informatics, Telematics and Automation
- Shanti Swarup Bhatnagar Award, India, 1998: for outstanding contributions in the field of Engineering Sciences
- Distinguished Alumnus Award by IIT Kanpur, India, September 1999
- Millennium Medal by Council of Scientific and Industrial Research, India, during Indian Science Congress, January 2000
- Copper Excellence Award for Technology Innovation
- Silicon India Leadership Award 2001 for Excellence and promise in Business & Technology Academics
- H.K.Firodia Award, India, 2002: for excellence in Science and Technology
- UGC Hari Om Ashram Trust Award by University Grants Commission, India, 2003: Outstanding Social Scientists for interaction between Science and Science and Society
- Om Prakash Bhasin Award, India, 2004: Science & Technology
- 27th IETE Ram Lal Wadhwa Gold Medal by the Institution of Electronics and Telecommunication Engineers, India, September 2004: outstanding contribution in the field of Electronics and Communication Engineering in the broadband sense, during the last ten years
- Jawaharlal Nehru Birth Centenary Lecture Award, Indian National Science Academy (INSA), India, 2006
- Bernard Lown Humanitarian Award, 2009
- Dronacharya award by The IndUS Entrepreneurs (TiE), Chennai, November 2011
- Member, National Academy of Engineering, USA, 2018: innovation and development of affordable technology solutions in communications and energy
- JC Bose Fellowship, India, 2010
- Fellow, IEEE, USA, 2009
- Fellow, Indian Academy of Sciences (IAS), India, January 2007: Engineering & Technology
- Fellow, Indian National Science Academy (INSA), New Delhi, India, 1999
- Fellow, National Academy of Sciences, India, 1999
- Fellow, Indian National Academy of Engineering (INAE), India, 1994
- Fellow Wireless World Research Forum, 2007
- Lifetime achievement award by TiE
- Voice & Data Lifetime Achievement Award by CyberMedia
- G.D. Naidu Award” for “Best Innovative Ecosystem” by NativeLead, 2022
- Lifetime Achievement Award by India Energy Storage Alliance (IESA), 2022
- Business Mentor Award” by Nanayam Vikatan Business Star Awards 2022
