= P. B. Sharma =

- Born: April 1948 (age 78); Vidisha, Madhya Pradesh
- Education: Samrat Ashok Technological Institute, University of Birmingham

Pritam Babu Sharma (born April 1948) is an Indian academic and Vice Chancellor of Amity University, Gurgaon and ex Vice Chancellor of Delhi Technological University. Currently he is heading the Association of Indian Universities as the President. Sharma has a career spanning 44 years of experience in teaching and research, which includes 12 years at IIT Delhi, where he was a Professor of mechanical engineering before taking over as Principal of Delhi College of Engineering (now Delhi Technological University) in 1990. He led Delhi College of Engineering till 2009, and was then appointed the founder Vice Chancellor of Delhi Technological University (DTU), when Delhi College of Engineering was upgraded to Delhi Technological University through Delhi Act 6 of 2009. He is also the founding Vice Chancellor of Rajiv Gandhi Technical University, Bhopal, Madhya Pradesh.

== Early life and education ==
Born in April 1948 at Vidisha in Madhya Pradesh, India, into a Sanadhya Brahmin Family. Sharma graduated in Mechanical Engineering from Samrat Ashok Technological Institute with a Gold Medal of the Faculty of Technology of Vikram University in 1969. He was selected as a National Scholar by Govt. of India, and sent to Birmingham, UK for higher studies. Sharma obtained his postgraduate degree in Mechanical Engineering from University of Birmingham (UK) in 1974. He later received his Doctorate Degree in Mechanical Engineering from the University of Birmingham (UK) in 1978. In 2013, Sharma was awarded Honorary Doctorate of Engineering (Honoris Causa) by University of Birmingham, U.K for his distinguished contributions to the advancement of frontiers of knowledge in the areas of Green Energy Technologies and Knowledge and Innovation Management.

== Career ==
Sharma has published over 230 research papers. He has provided industrial consultancy to organizations including Rolls-Royce of the UK and the Gas Turbine Research Establishment in Bangalore. He has addressed professional gatherings across the world. As vice chancellor of Delhi Technological University, he has brought about a significant rise in the growth of the university.
