= CEWIT =

CEWIT may refer to:

- CEWiT (India)
- CEWIT (Stony Brook University)
