= Vidisha =

City in Central India

Vidisha विदिशा (Vidishā) (Hindi)
- City
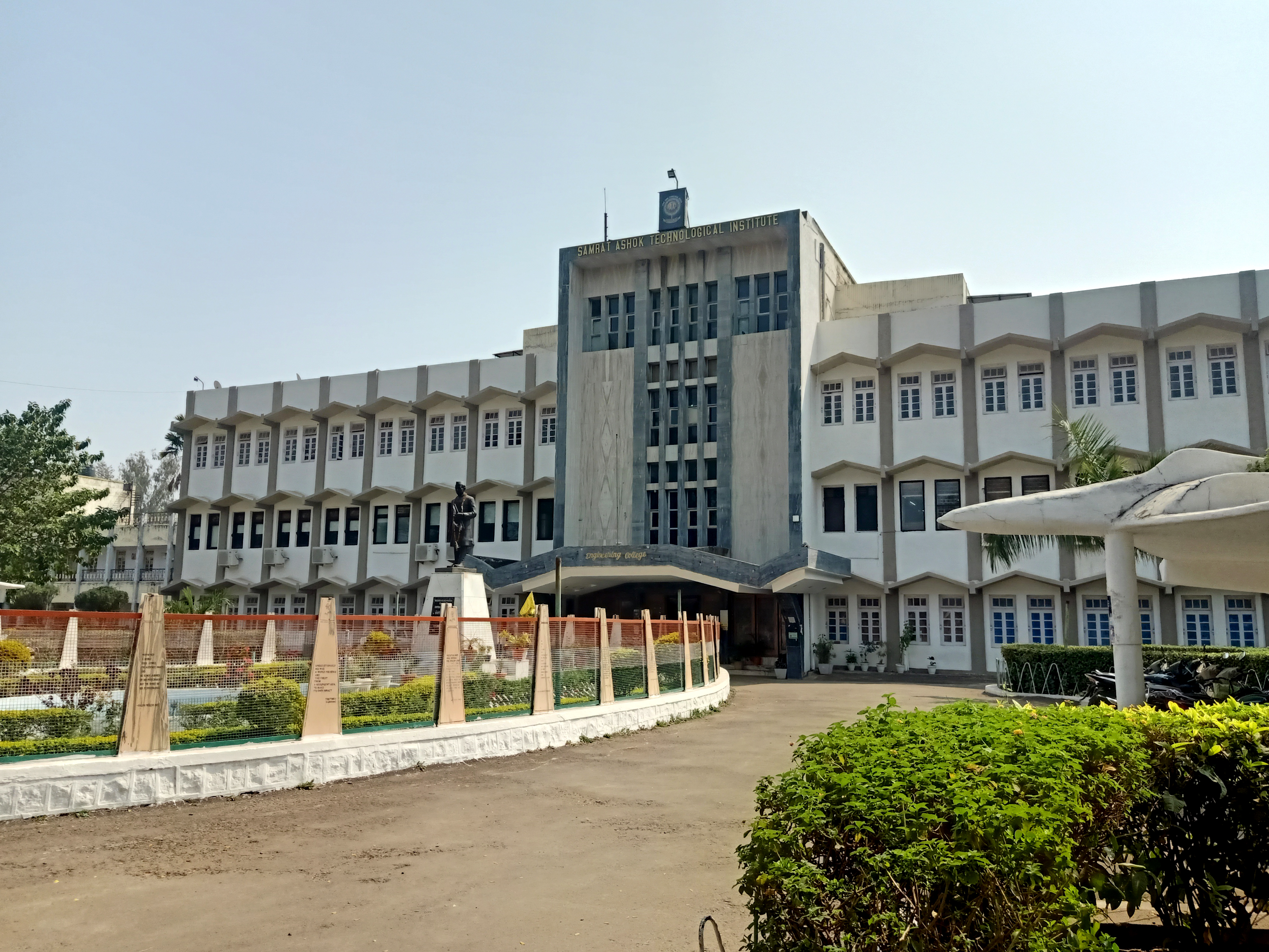
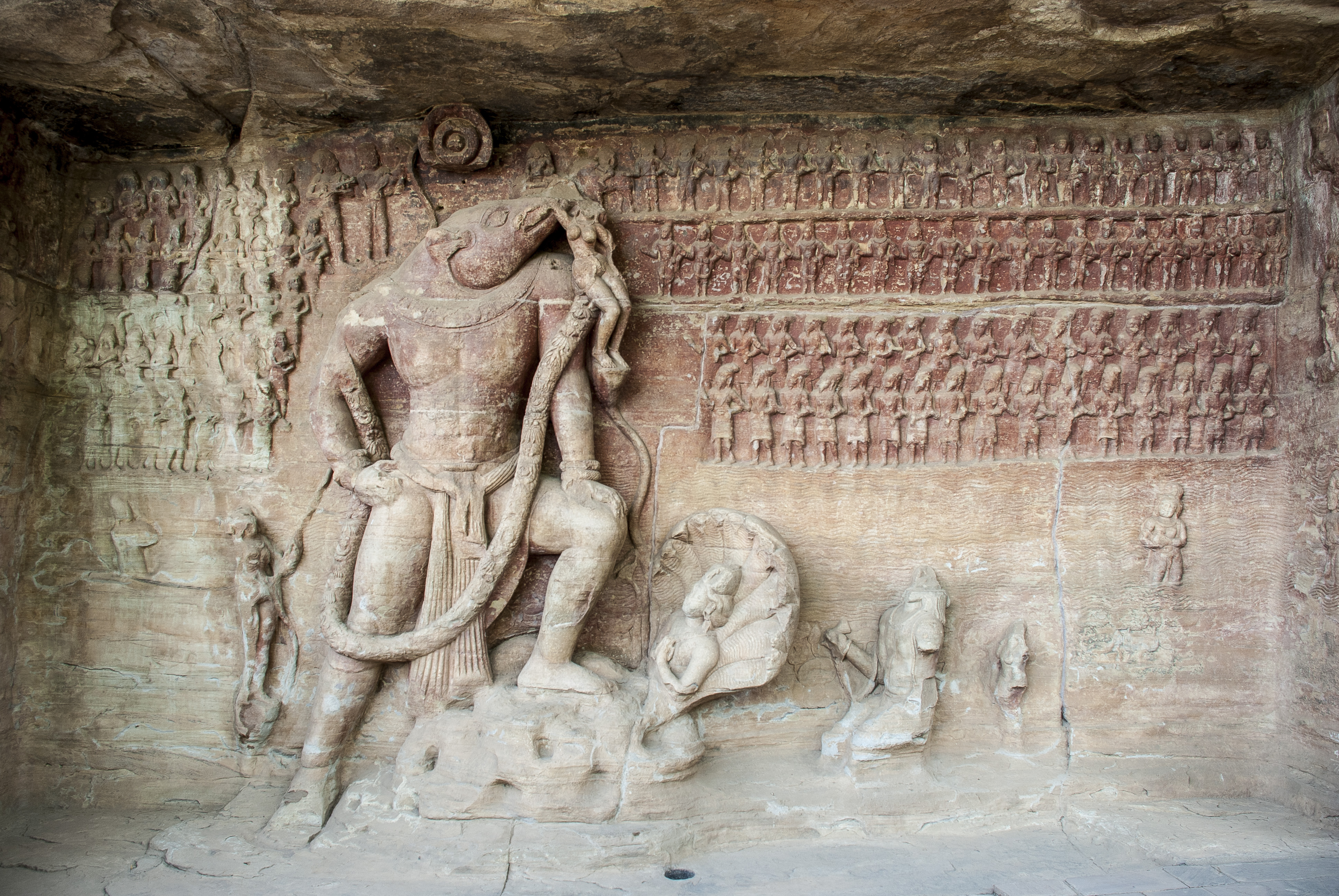
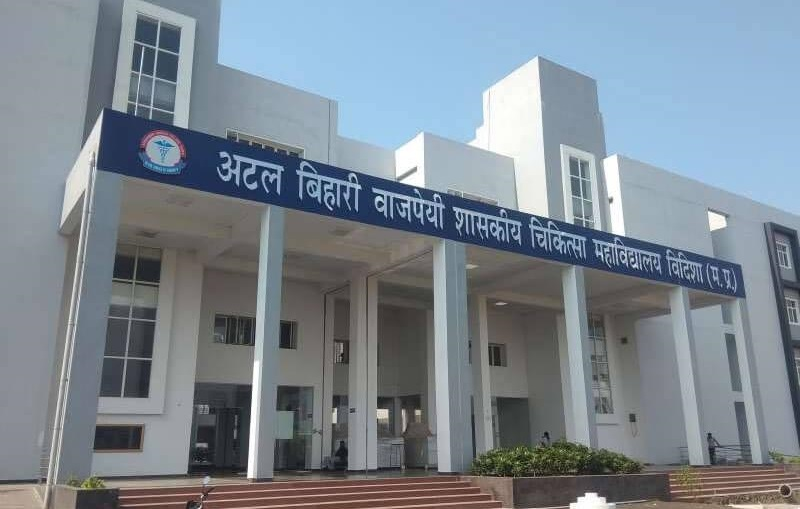
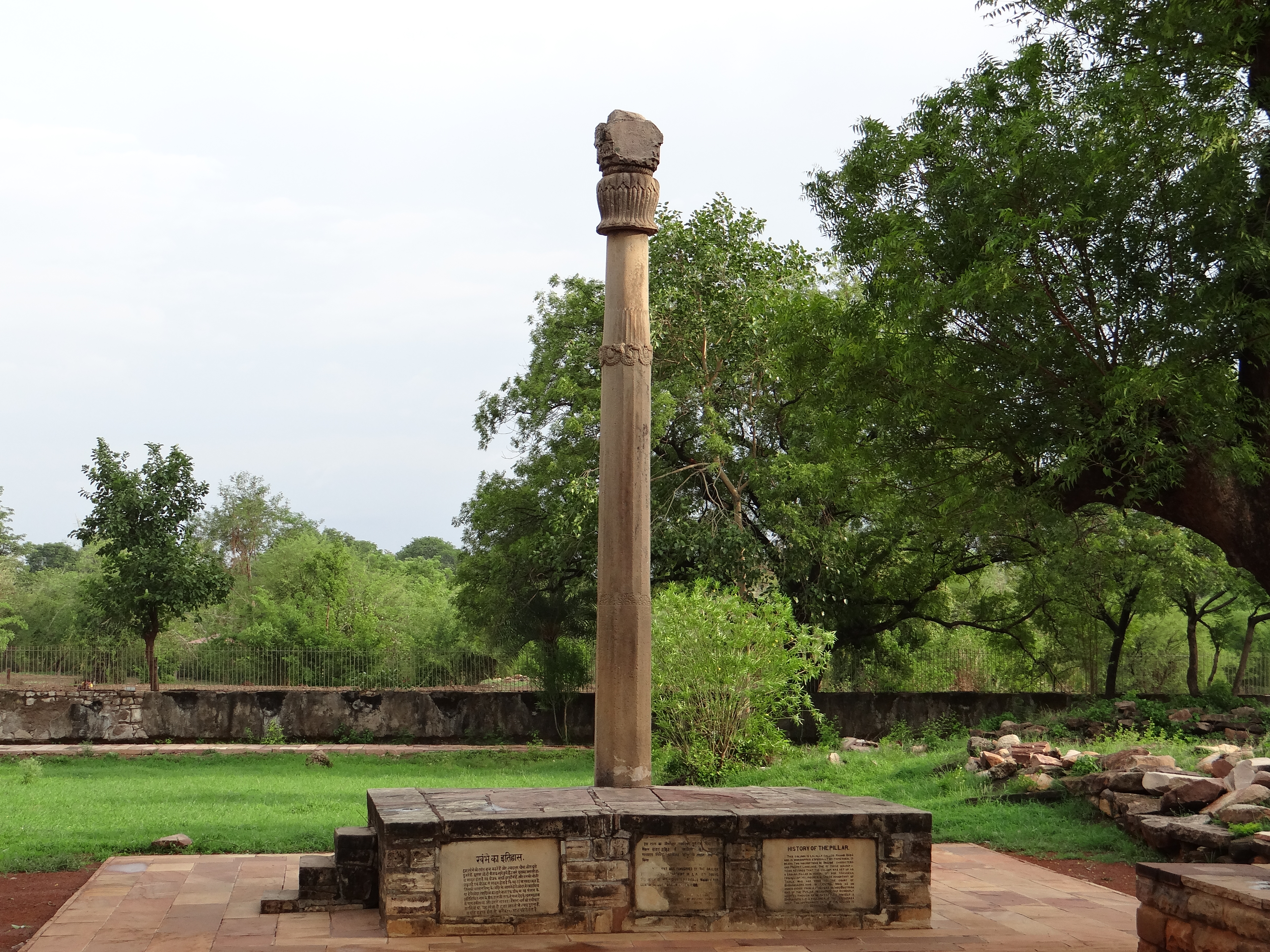
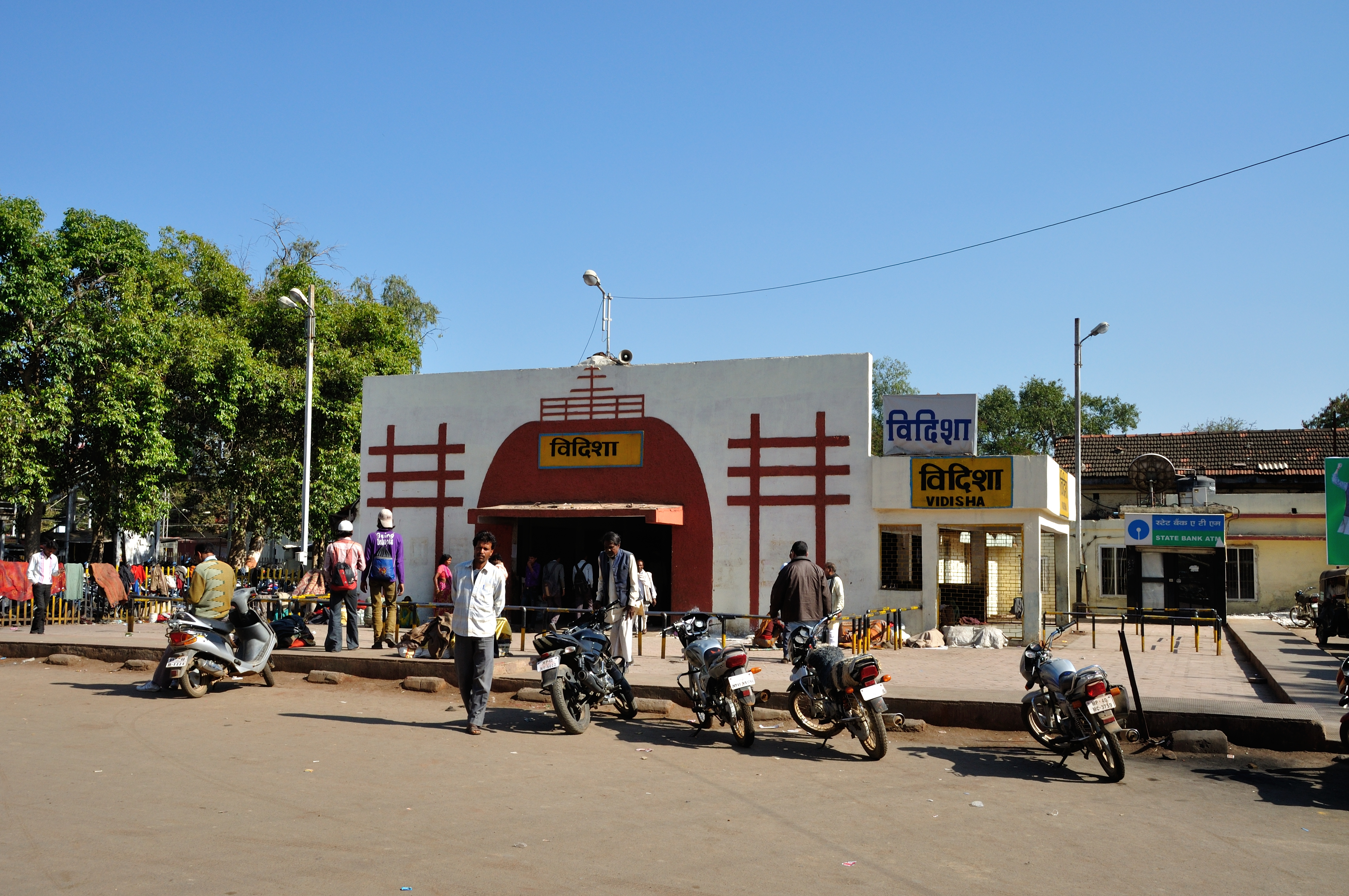
- Samrat Ashok Technological Institute Ancient Sculpture of Varahavtar, Udayagiri Atal Bihari Vajpayee Government Medical College Heliodorus pillar Vidisha Railway Station

- Location of the city in Madhya Pradesh Location of the city in India Location of the city in Asia
- Coordinates: 23.53°N 77.82°E
- Country: India
- State: Madhya Pradesh
- Division: Bhopal
- District: Vidisha
- Lok Sabha seat Vidhan Sabha seat: Vidisha constituency Vidisha constituency

Government
  - Type: Municipal Council
  - Body: Municipal Council Vidisha
  - President: Preeti Rakesh Sharma (BJP)

Dimensions (approx)
  - Length: 5.2 km (3.2 mi)
  - Width: 7.4 km (4.6 mi)
- Elevation: 424 m (1,391 ft)
- Highest elevation (Lohangi Parvat): 451 m (1,480 ft)

Population (2011 census)
  - Total: 155,951
  - Rank: 19th in Madhya Pradesh; 298th in India

Transportation
  - Airport: N/A
  - Railway Station: Vidisha Railway Station
  - Metro: N/A
- Time zone: UTC+5:30 (IST)
- PINs: 464 001
- Area code: +91-7592
- Vehicle registration: MP 40
- Official language: Hindi
- Website: vidisha.nic.in

Vidisha (formerly known as Bhelsa, Besnagar and Bhaddalpur in ancient times) is a city in the state of Madhya Pradesh, India. It is a Jain pilgrimage center and the administrative headquarters of Vidisha district. It is located 62.5 km northeast of the state capital, Bhopal. The name "Vidisha" is derived from the nearby river "Bais", mentioned in the Puranas. "Vidisha" also finds its historic reference in ancient epic Ramayana, under the rule of Rama's youngest brother Shatrughna, later on under the rule of Shatrughna's younger son Shatrughati.

== History ==
=== Ancient History ===
Vidishā was the administrative headquarters of Bhelsa, or Bhilsa, during the Medieval period. It was renamed Vidisha in 1956. Vidisha is also amongst the 112 Aspirational District in the Aspirational District Programme launched by NITI Aayog in 2018. Towards the seventh or eighth century, Bhadravati was raised from its ruins by a Bheel chieftain, who surrounded it with walls, and gave it the name of Bhilsa. When, in the year 1230, the Emperor Altamsh took possession of it, it was the seat of a Rajpoot prince of the Chohan clan. It was not, however, finally wrested from the Hindus until the year 1570, under Akbar.

==== Besnagar ====
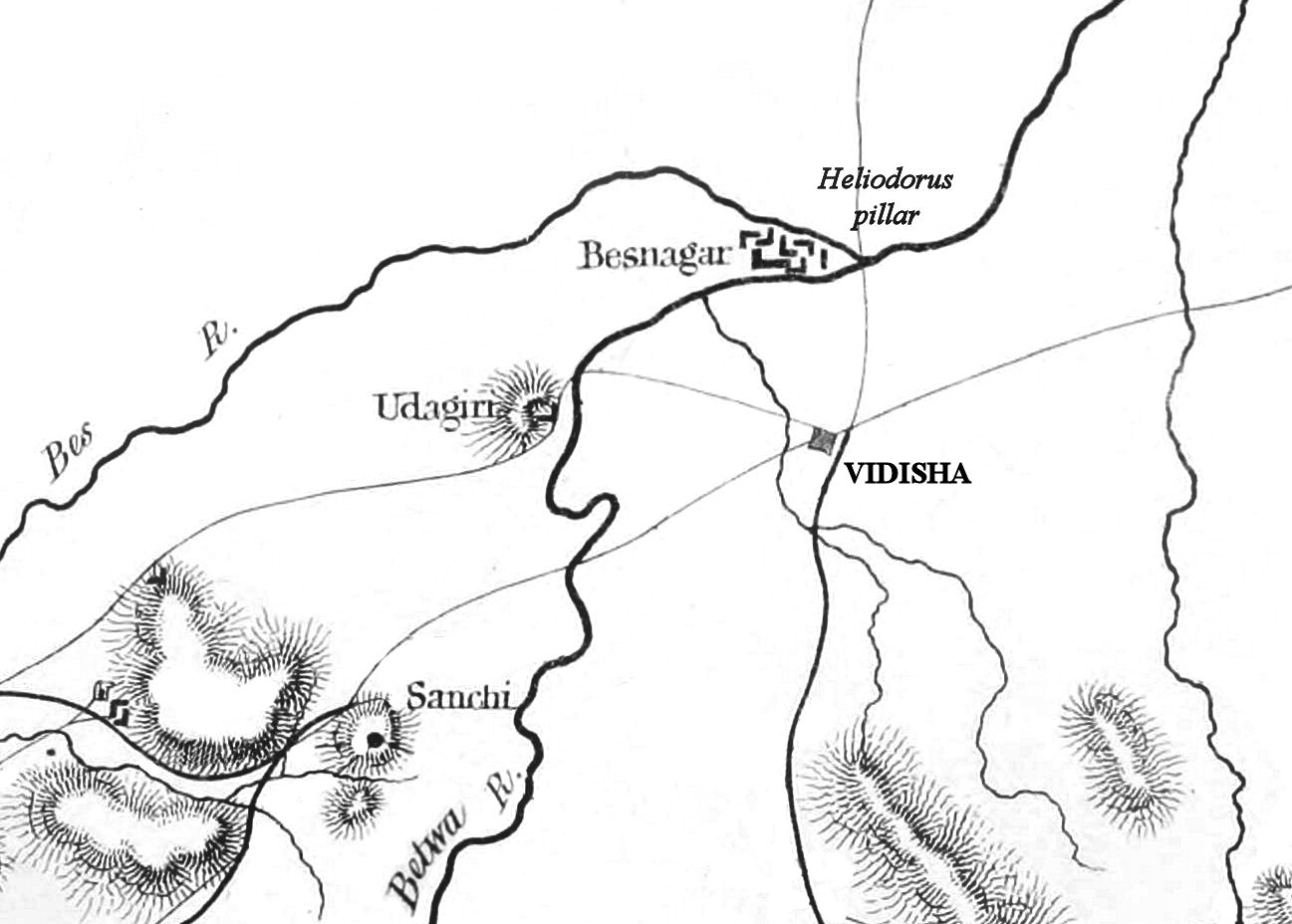
Relative locations of the Heliodorus pillar, Besnagar, Vidisha, Sanchi and the Udayagiri Caves.

The town is situated east of the Betwa River, in the fork of the Betwa and Bes rivers, 9 km from Sanchi. The town of Besnagar, 3 km from present-day Vidisha on the west side of the river, became an important trade centre in the 6th and 5th centuries BCE, under the Shungas, Nagas, Satavahanas, and Guptas, and was mentioned in the Pali scriptures. The Emperor Ashoka was the governor of Vidisha during his father's lifetime. His Buddhist Empress Vidisha Devi who was also his first wife, was brought up in Vidisha. It finds mention in Kalidasa's Meghaduta.

The ruins of Besnagar were inspected by Alexander Cunningham in 1874–1875. Remains of a large defensive wall were found on the western side of the city. Ancient Buddhist railings were also found just outside of the city, which had probably adorned a stupa. Numerous coins were found, including nine coins of the Western Satraps.

The Heliodorus Pillar is a stone column, which was constructed in about 150 BCE. This stone column was erected by the Greek ambassador of the Indo-Greek King Antialcidas, who came to the court of Bhagabhadra, a possible Sunga king. Dedicated to Vāsudeva, this column was constructed in front of the temple of Vāsudeva. The pillar is situated about four kilometers away from the city on Vidisha-Ganj Basoda SH-14, located on the northern bank of the Vais River. It is a 20 feet and 7 inches tall stone pillar, commonly called Kham Baba. The script used in the inscription is Brahmi but the language is Prakrit, recording that Heliodorus erected the pillar as a Garuda Stambha to pay homage to Vasudeva, who was later integrated as a manifestation of Vishnu.

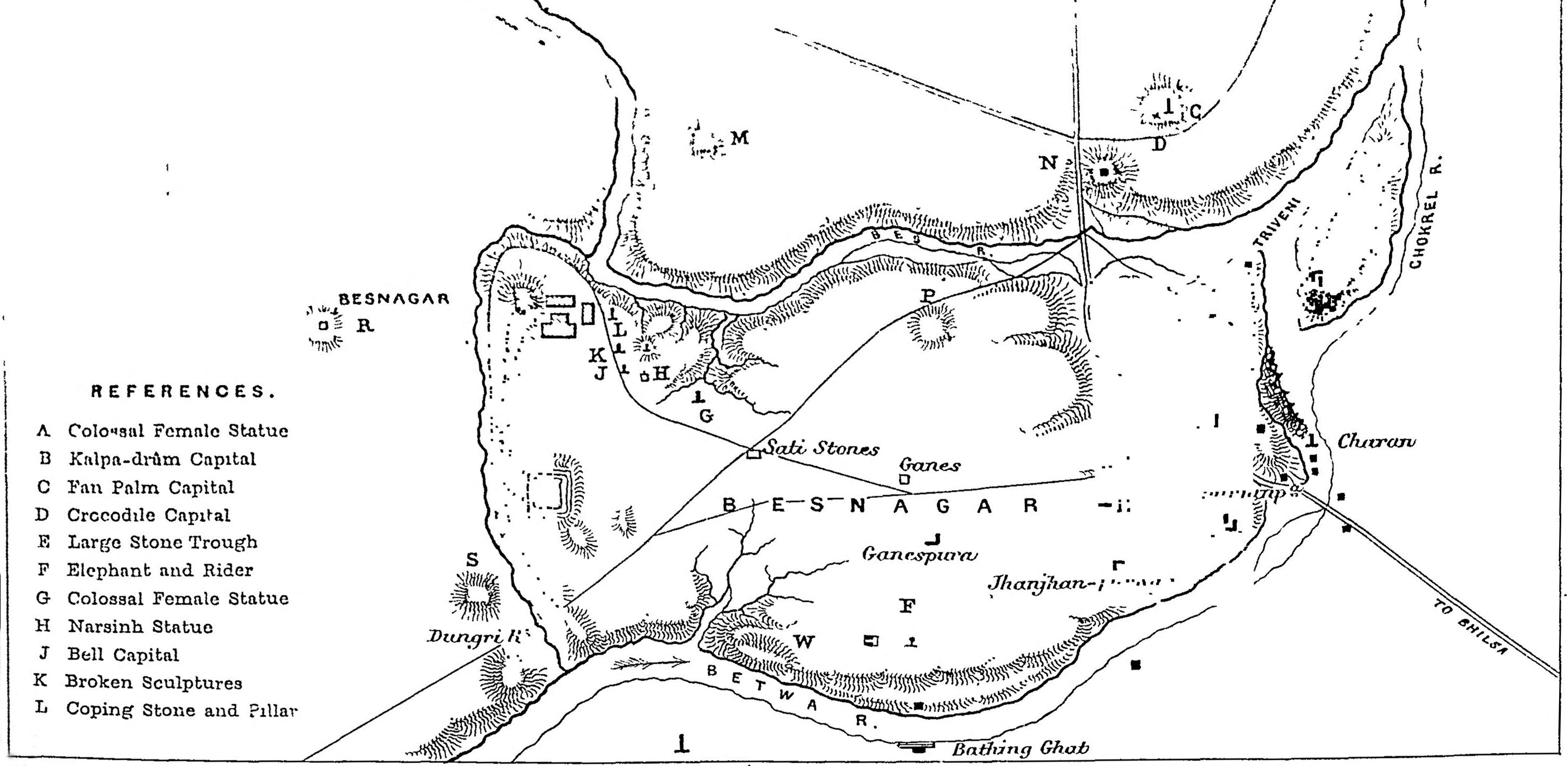
Archaeological plan of the old city of Besnagar

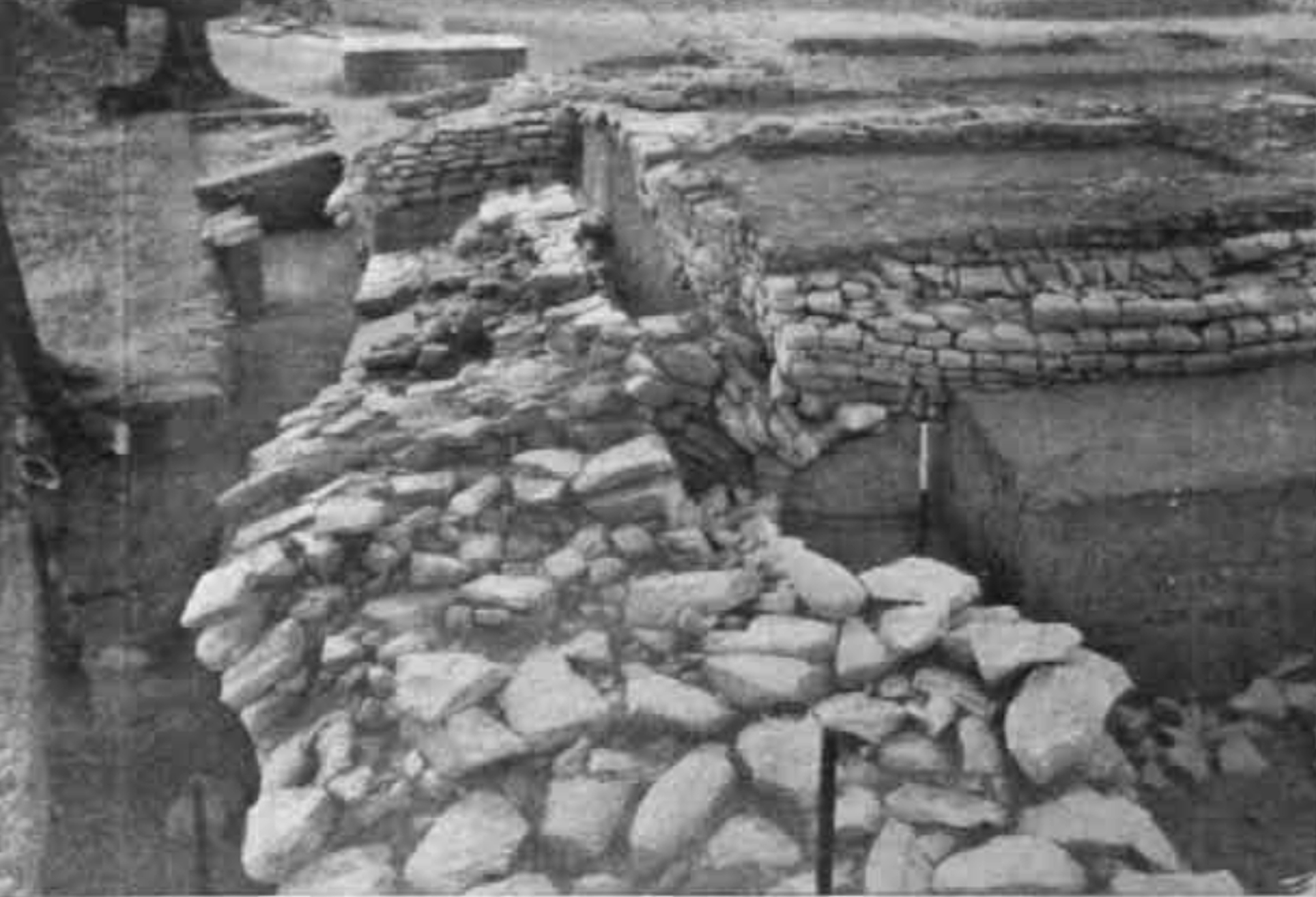
Archaeological layers at Besnagar: the Temple of Vāsudeva in the forefront, and the Heliodorus pillar in the back

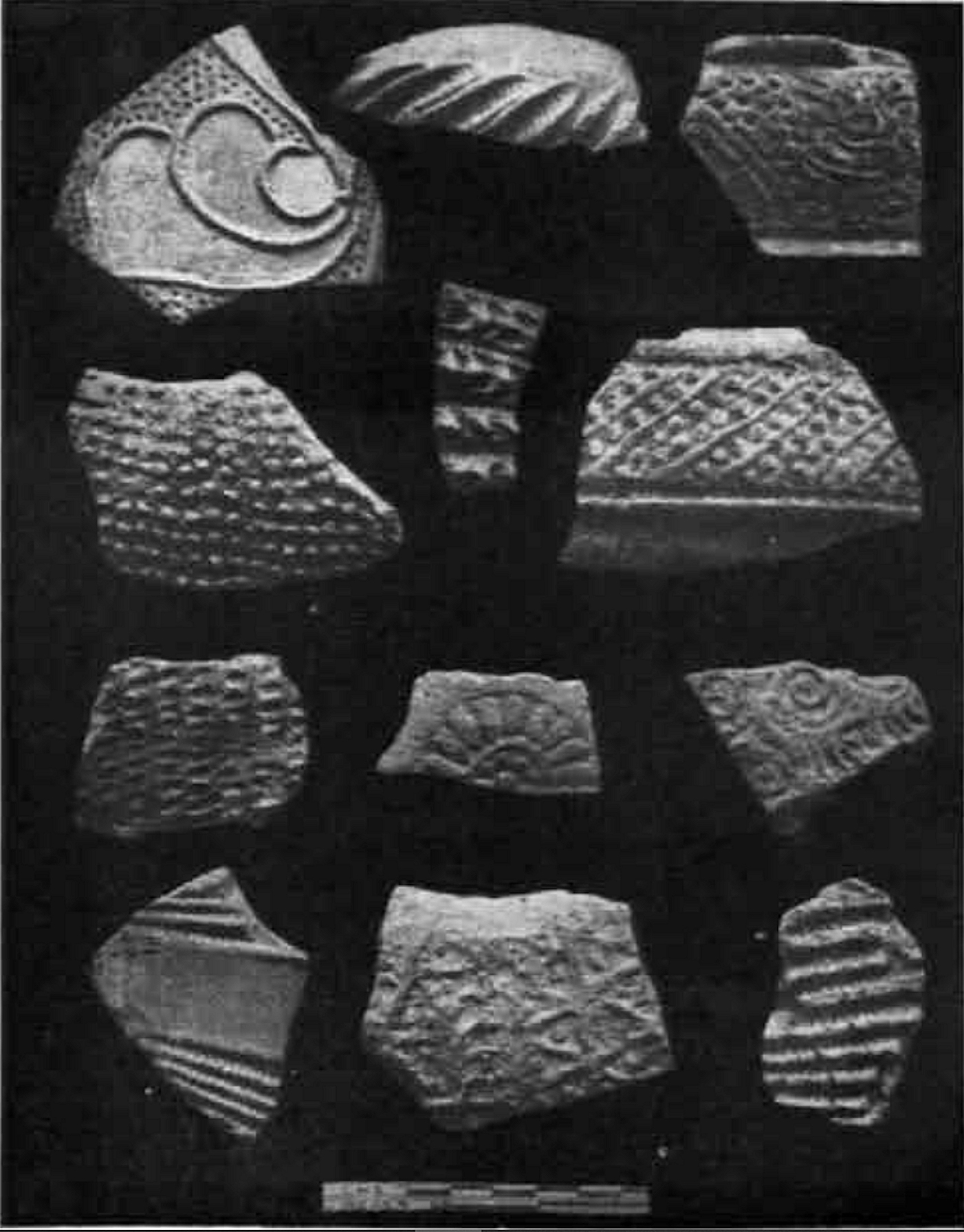
Besnagar pottery Period V

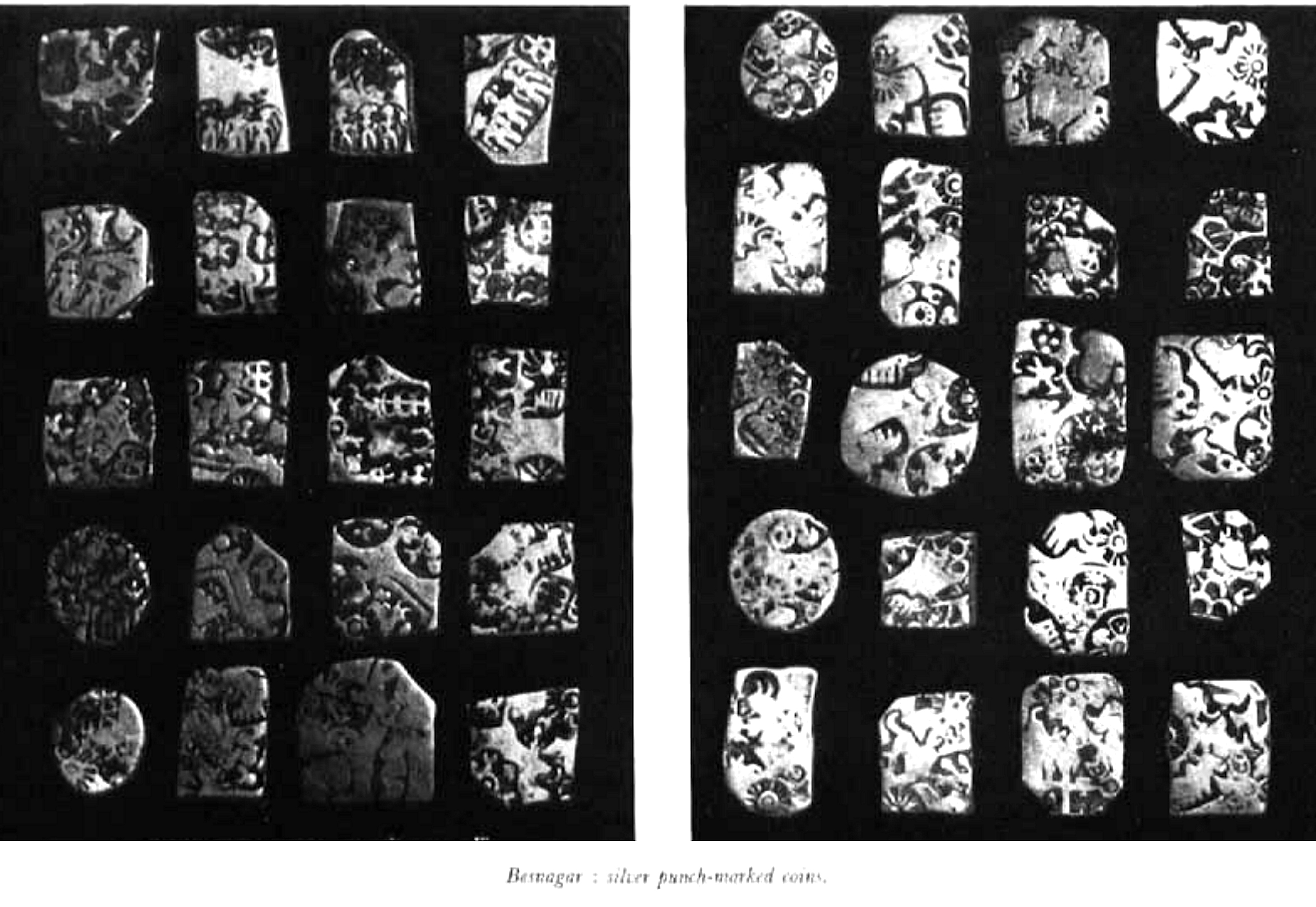
Besnagar silver punch-marked coins.

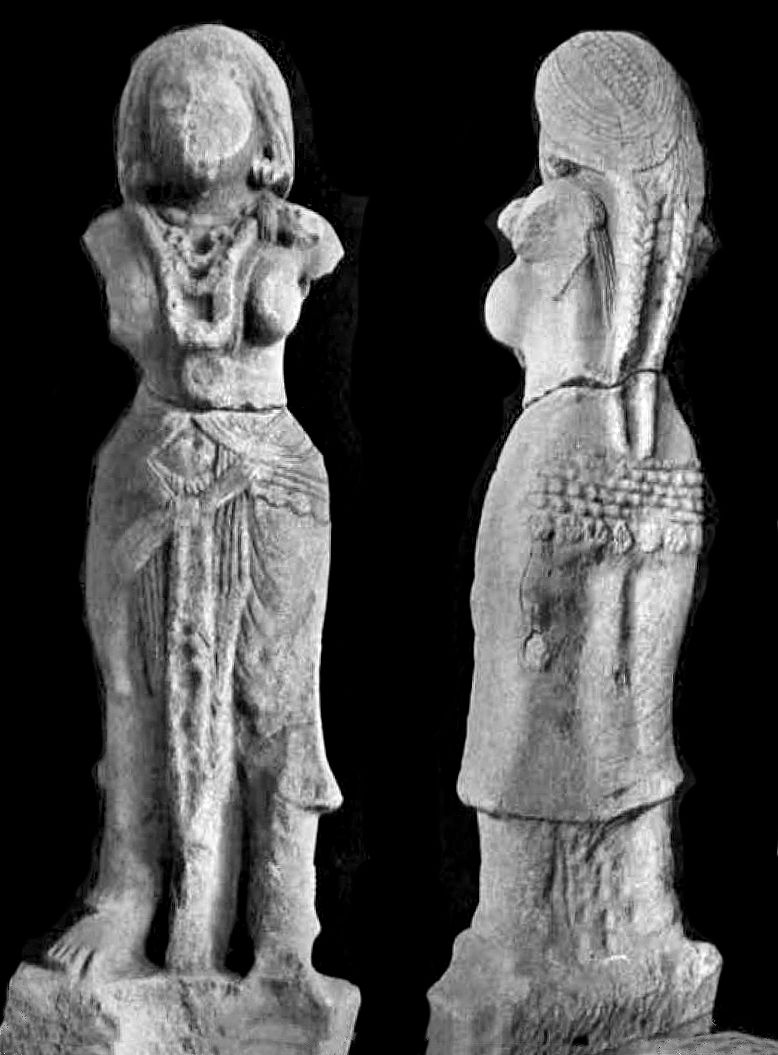
Besnagar Yakshini

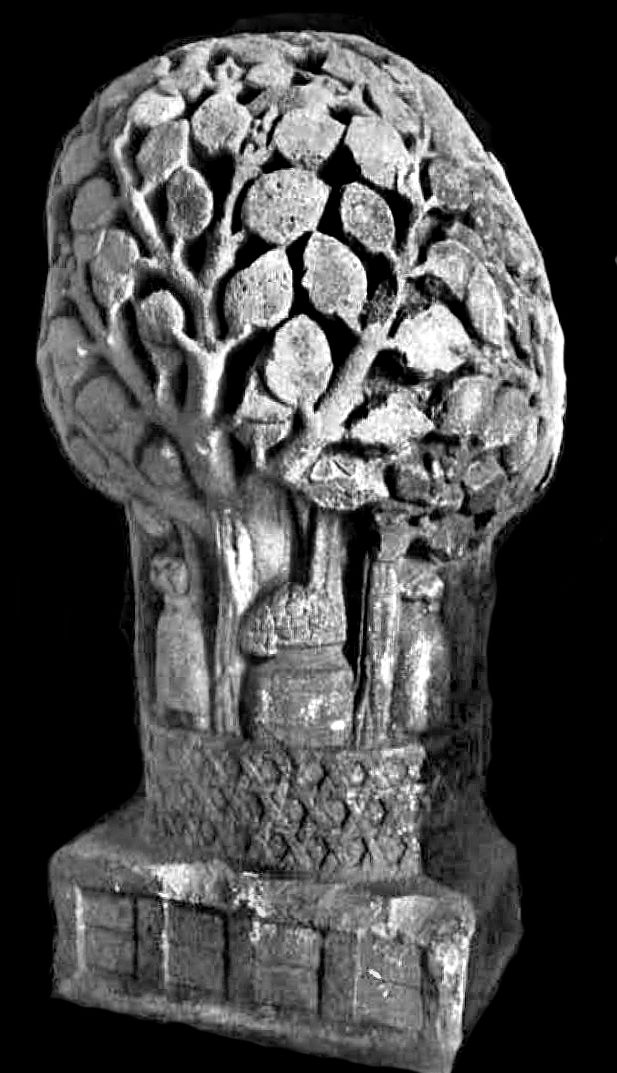
Besnagar Kalpadruma

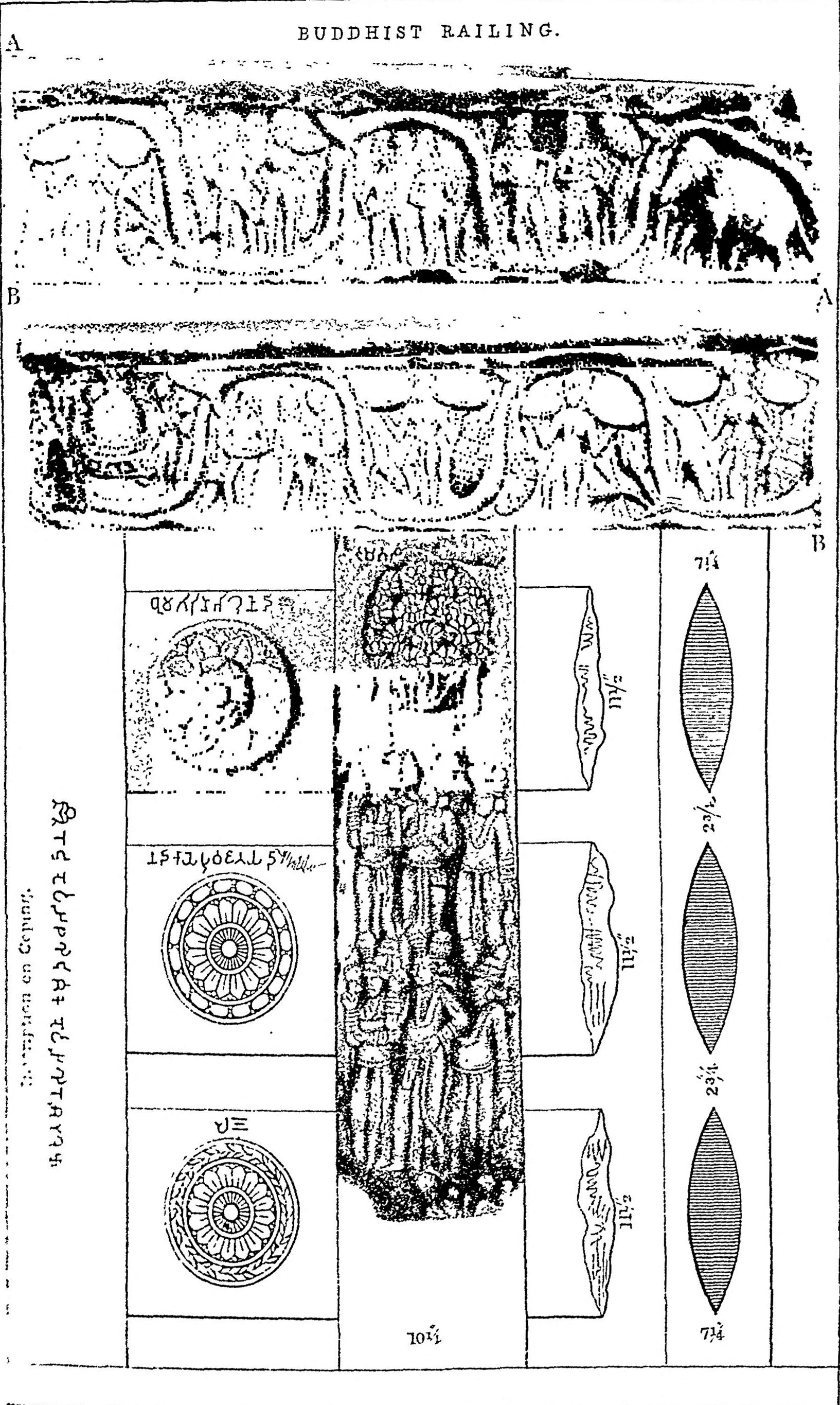
Besnagar Buddhist railings

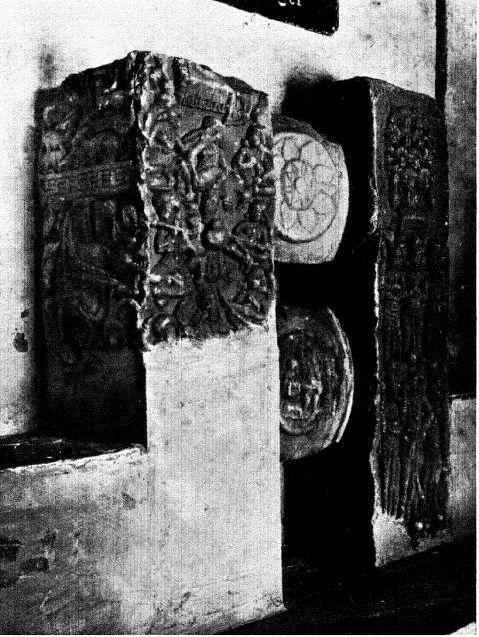
Besnagar Buddhist railings

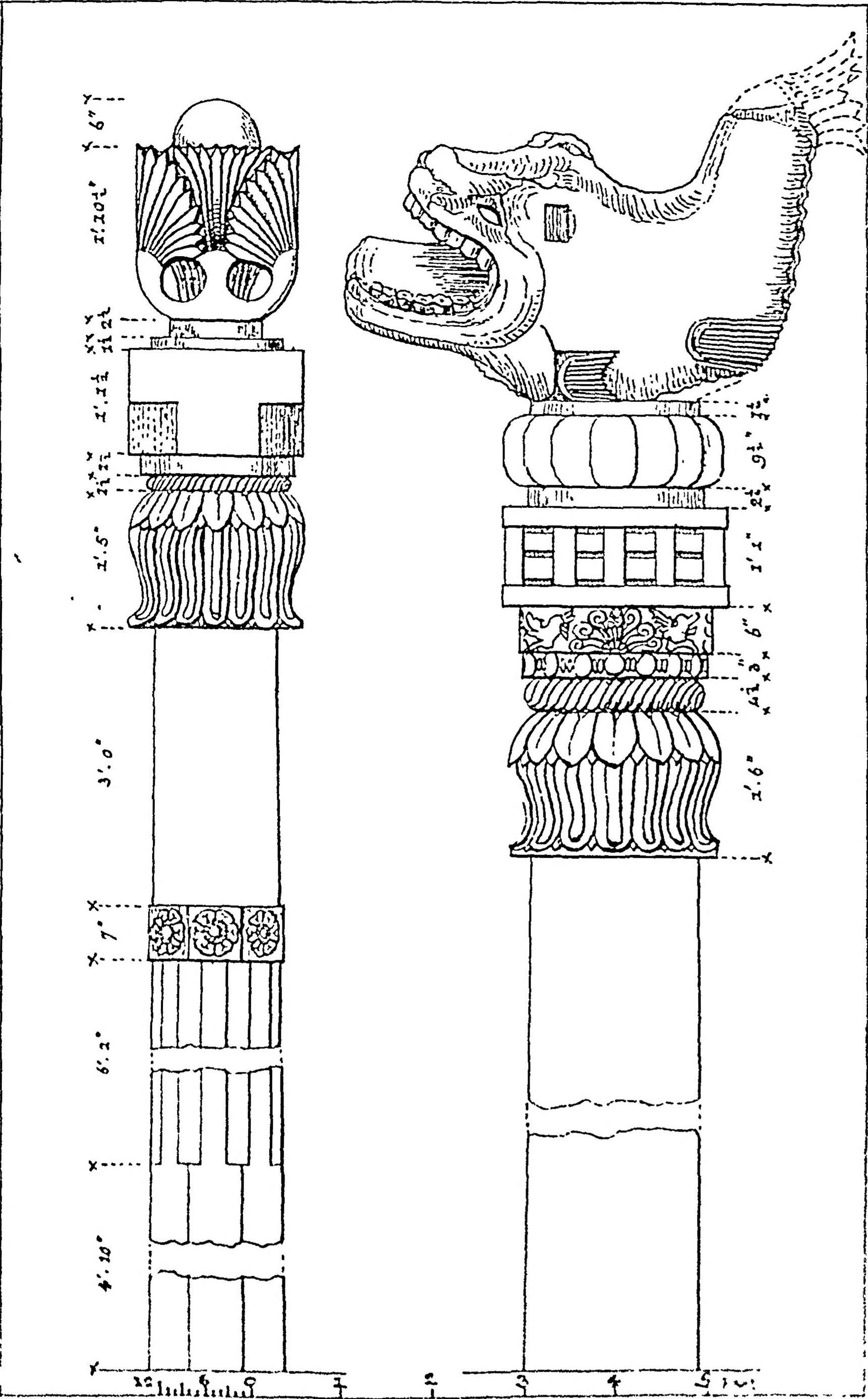
Besnagar pillar capitals

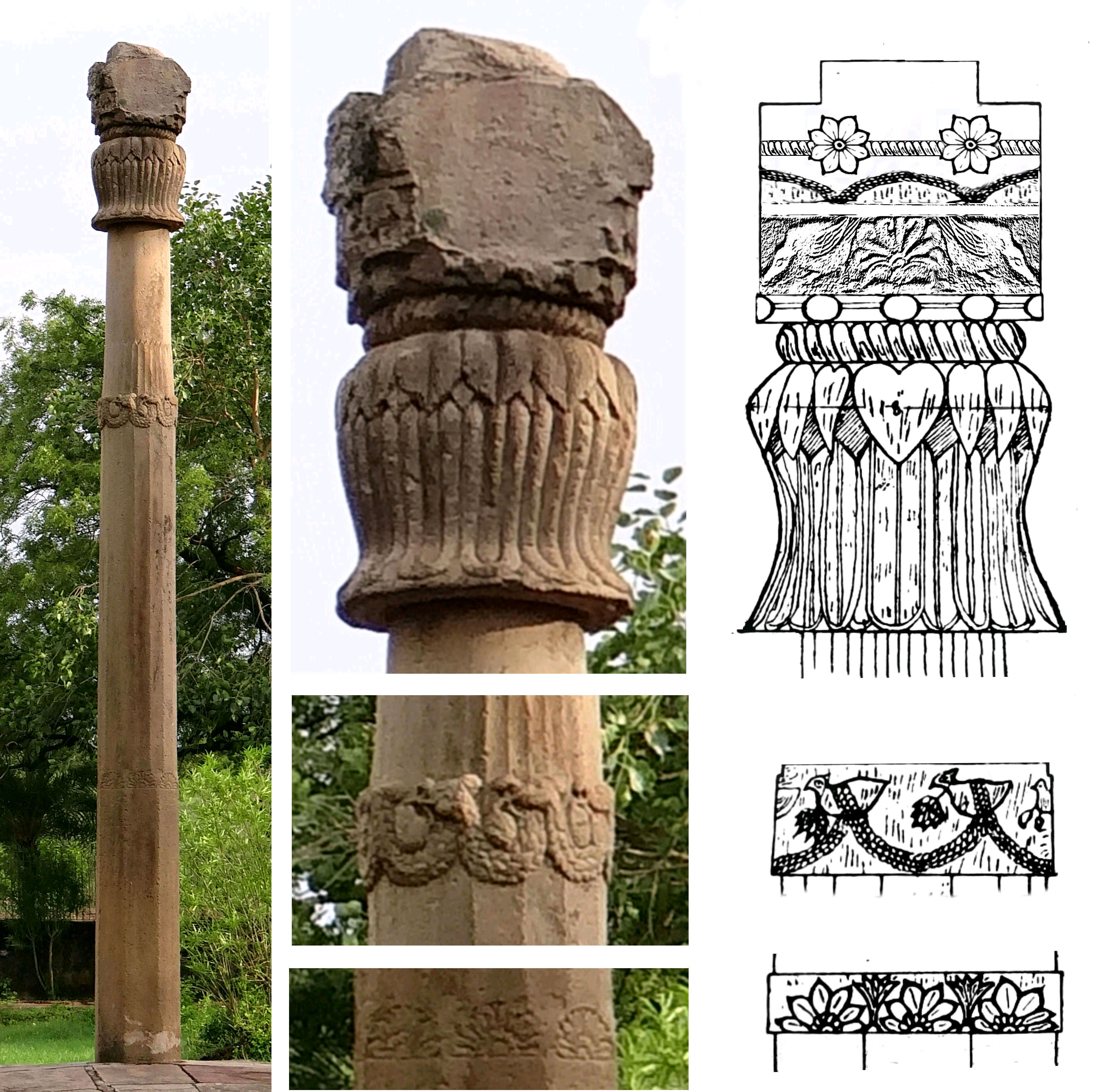
View of Heliodorus pillar

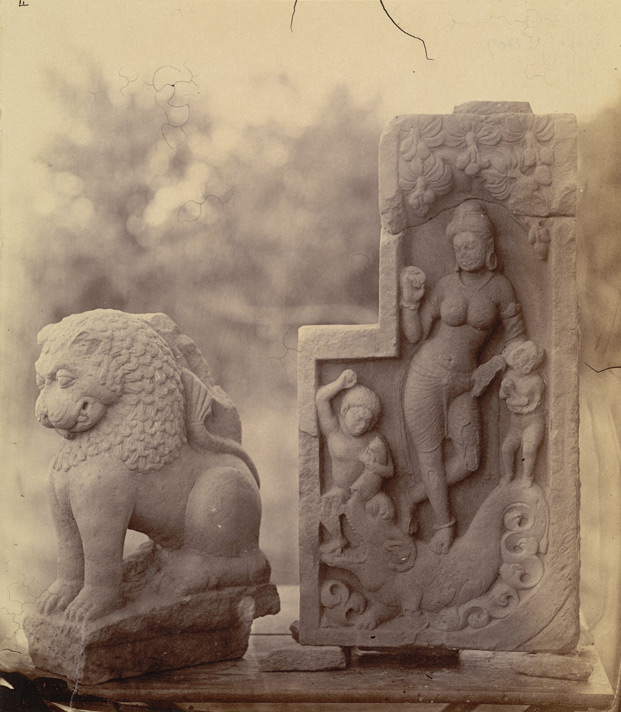
Besnagar Ganga statue

=== Medieval History ===
==== Emergence as Bhelsa ====
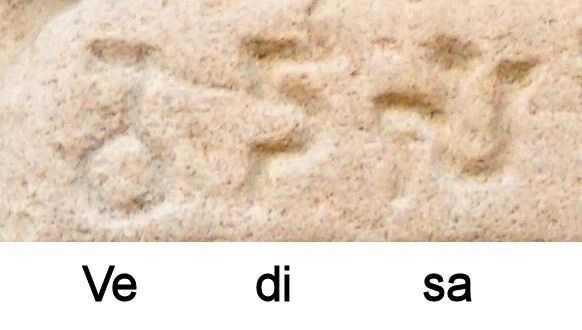
The inscription 𑀯𑁂𑀤𑀺𑀲 Vedisa (for the city of Vidisha) at Sanchi, Brahmi script, 1st century BCE.

Besnagar was known as Bhelsa during the medieval period. It became famous for the temple of the Sun god Bhillasvamin. It was ruled by the Later Gupta king Devagupta of Malwa and Rashtrakuta king Krishna III. The name is first noted in an inscription of 878 CE by a merchant Hatiaka of Paravada community. The 12th-century Tri-shashthi-shalaka-purusha-charitra mentions an image of Bhillasvamin at Vidisa, along with a copy of Jivant Swami buried in the sand. Minhajuddin's Tabaqat-i-Nusiri states that the temple was destroyed by Iltutmish in 1233–34 CE.

In 1293, Alauddin Khalji of the Delhi Sultanate sacked the city as a general of Sultan Jalaluddin. The attack was illustrative of Vidisha's importance in the medieval era. In 1532 Bhilsa was sacked by Bahadur Shah of Gujarat Sultanate. It then passed on to the Malwa Sultans, the Mughals and the Scindias.

=== Modern History ===
During the British colonial period up to India's independence, the region of Vidisha—then widely known as Bhilsa or Bhelsa—functioned primarily as a strategic administrative territory under the princely state of Gwalior.

The Quit India Movement in Madhya Pradesh was started from Vidisha in August 1942.

== Geography ==
Vidisha is situated at 23.53°N latitude and 77.82°E longitude. Nestled in the eastern Malwa region at an average elevation of 424 meters, it is bordered by the Betwa and Bes rivers, featuring highly fertile black soil, an agricultural economy, and surrounding low hills.

=== Climate ===
Climate data for Vidisha (1981–2010, extremes 1970–2003)
Month	Jan	Feb	Mar	Apr	May	Jun	Jul	Aug	Sep	Oct	Nov	Dec	Year
Record high °C (°F)	35.0 (95.0)	36.2 (97.2)	42.1 (107.8)	46.9 (116.4)	49.1 (120.4)	49.0 (120.2)	43.3 (109.9)	38.6 (101.5)	39.0 (102.2)	40.8 (105.4)	38.0 (100.4)	35.0 (95.0)	49.1 (120.4)
Mean daily maximum °C (°F)	26.2 (79.2)	29.5 (85.1)	34.7 (94.5)	40.2 (104.4)	42.8 (109.0)	38.9 (102.0)	32.3 (90.1)	30.3 (86.5)	32.2 (90.0)	34.0 (93.2)	31.4 (88.5)	27.9 (82.2)	33.4 (92.1)
Mean daily minimum °C (°F)	8.3 (46.9)	10.8 (51.4)	15.3 (59.5)	20.5 (68.9)	26.1 (79.0)	25.5 (77.9)	23.4 (74.1)	23.6 (74.5)	21.5 (70.7)	18.3 (64.9)	13.0 (55.4)	9.1 (48.4)	17.9 (64.2)
Record low °C (°F)	0.0 (32.0)	2.5 (36.5)	5.8 (42.4)	13.1 (55.6)	18.5 (65.3)	16.3 (61.3)	13.0 (55.4)	10.0 (50.0)	10.1 (50.2)	11.0 (51.8)	4.9 (40.8)	3.1 (37.6)	0.0 (32.0)
Average rainfall mm (inches)	5.9 (0.23)	12.2 (0.48)	11.4 (0.45)	3.8 (0.15)	17.9 (0.70)	116.7 (4.59)	310.5 (12.22)	332.0 (13.07)	177.4 (6.98)	48.3 (1.90)	6.1 (0.24)	5.4 (0.21)	1,047.3 (41.23)
Average rainy days	0.6	1.1	0.9	0.4	1.1	6.7	12.5	13.4	7.5	2.4	0.6	0.2	47.2
Average relative humidity (%) (at 17:30 IST)	51	42	32	27	26	49	73	81	71	50	46	47	50
Source: India Meteorological Department

== Demographics ==
Historical population
Year	Pop.	±%
1901	7,481	—
1911	8,427	+12.6%
1921	8,801	+4.4%
1931	10,570	+20.1%
1941	14,472	+36.9%
1951	19,184	+32.6%
1961	27,718	+44.5%
1971	43,212	+55.9%
1981	65,521	+51.6%
1991	92,922	+41.8%
2001	125,453	+35.0%
2011	155,951	+24.3%
2026	232,000	+48.8%
Census data of 2001 and 2011, 2026 data is expected.

As of the 2011 Census of India, Vidisha had a population of 155,951 a 24.3% increase from 2001 (125,453 in 2001 census). Males constitute 53.21% of the population and females 46.79%. Vidisha has an average literacy rate of 86.88%, higher than the national average of 74.04%: male literacy is 92.29%, and female literacy is 80.98%. In Vidisha, 15% of the population is under 6 years of age.

=== Ethnic groups and religions ===
As per the 2011 Census, Hinduism was the major religion with nearly 88.09% of the adherents, followed by Islam (6.47%), Jainism (4.73%), Sikhism (0.33%), Christianity (0.23%) and Buddhism (0.07%).

Religion in Vidisha (2011)
Religion	Percent
Hinduism	88.09%
Jainism	4.73%
Islam	6.47%
Sikhism	0.33%
Christianity	0.23%
Buddhism	0.07%
Other or not stated	0.09%

==== Jainism in Vidisha ====
Vidisha is considered to be Puranakshetras Jain tirtha. Bhaddalpur (now Vidisha) is also believed to be the birthplace of Shitalanatha, the tenth tirthankar. There are 14 temples in Vidisha district, among which Bada Mandir, Bajramath Jain temple, Maladevi temple, Gadarmal temple and Pathari Jain temple, built between 9th-10th centuries CE, are the most prominent. These temples are rich in architecture.

=== Language ===
Hindi is the most widely spoken language, with Bundeli as its major dialect.

== Culture ==
Ravana has been worshipped in Vidisha for centuries by the Kanyakubja Brahmins. During Vijayadashami, Thousands of local Brahmins of Vidisha i.e. the Kanyakubja Brahmins and people of other castes worship him as their reigning deity.

== Historic places and monuments ==
=== Inside the city ===
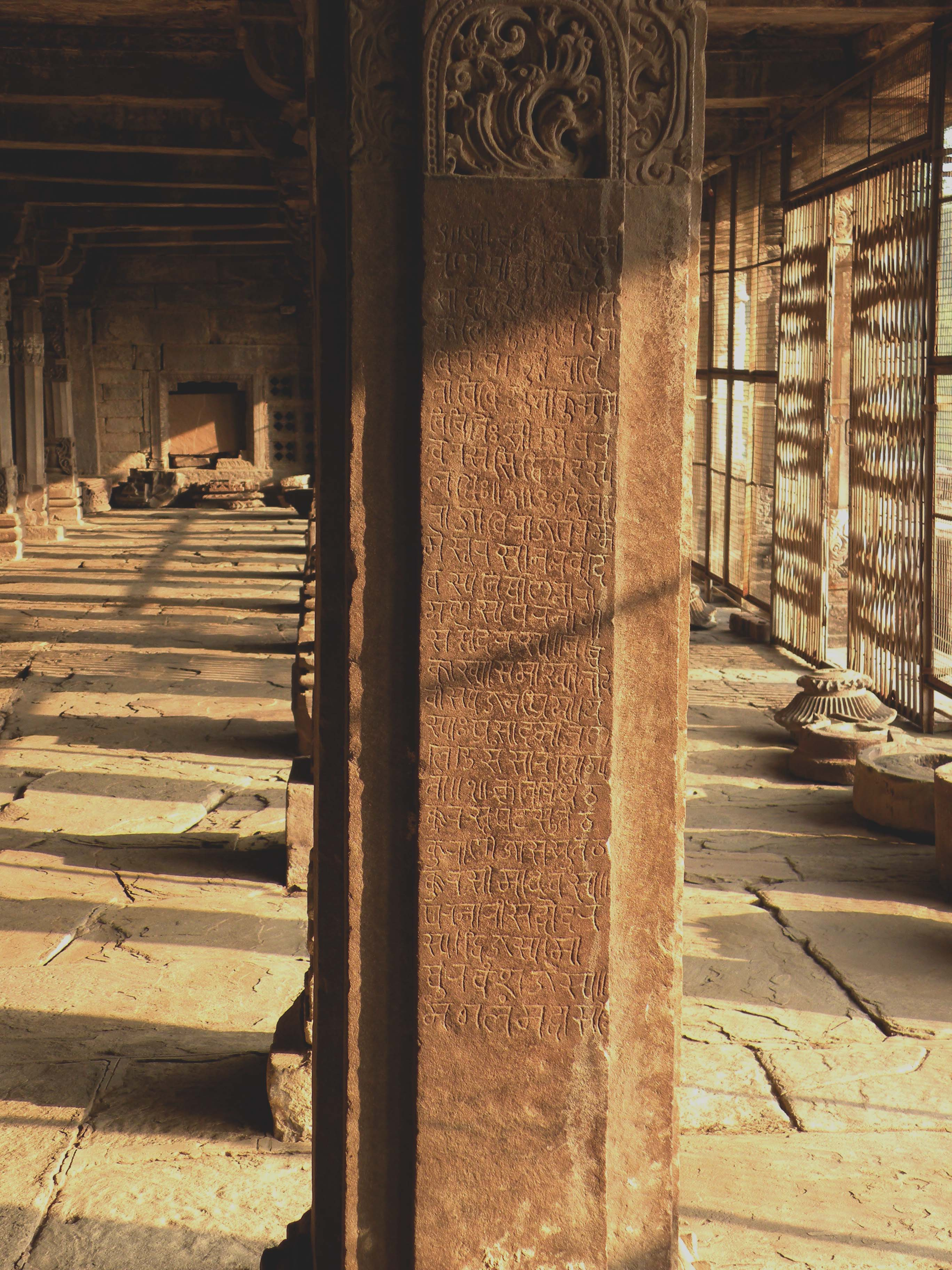
Pillar in the Bijamaṇḍal, Vidisha, with an inscription of King Naravarman (ruled c. 1094 – c. 1130 CE).

- Bijamaṇḍal (historically Vijay Mandir) located near the eastern edge of the old town are the remains of a large temple of the late Paramara period. The building was probably started in the second half of the 11th century. That it was never finished is evidenced by the unfinished carved niches and architectural pieces found round the base of the temple plinth. On top of the plinth is a small mosque made using pillars, one of which has an inscription dating probably from the time of king Naravarman (circa 1094–1134). It is a devotional inscription revering Carccikā (i.e. Cāmuṇḍā), of whom he was a devotee.

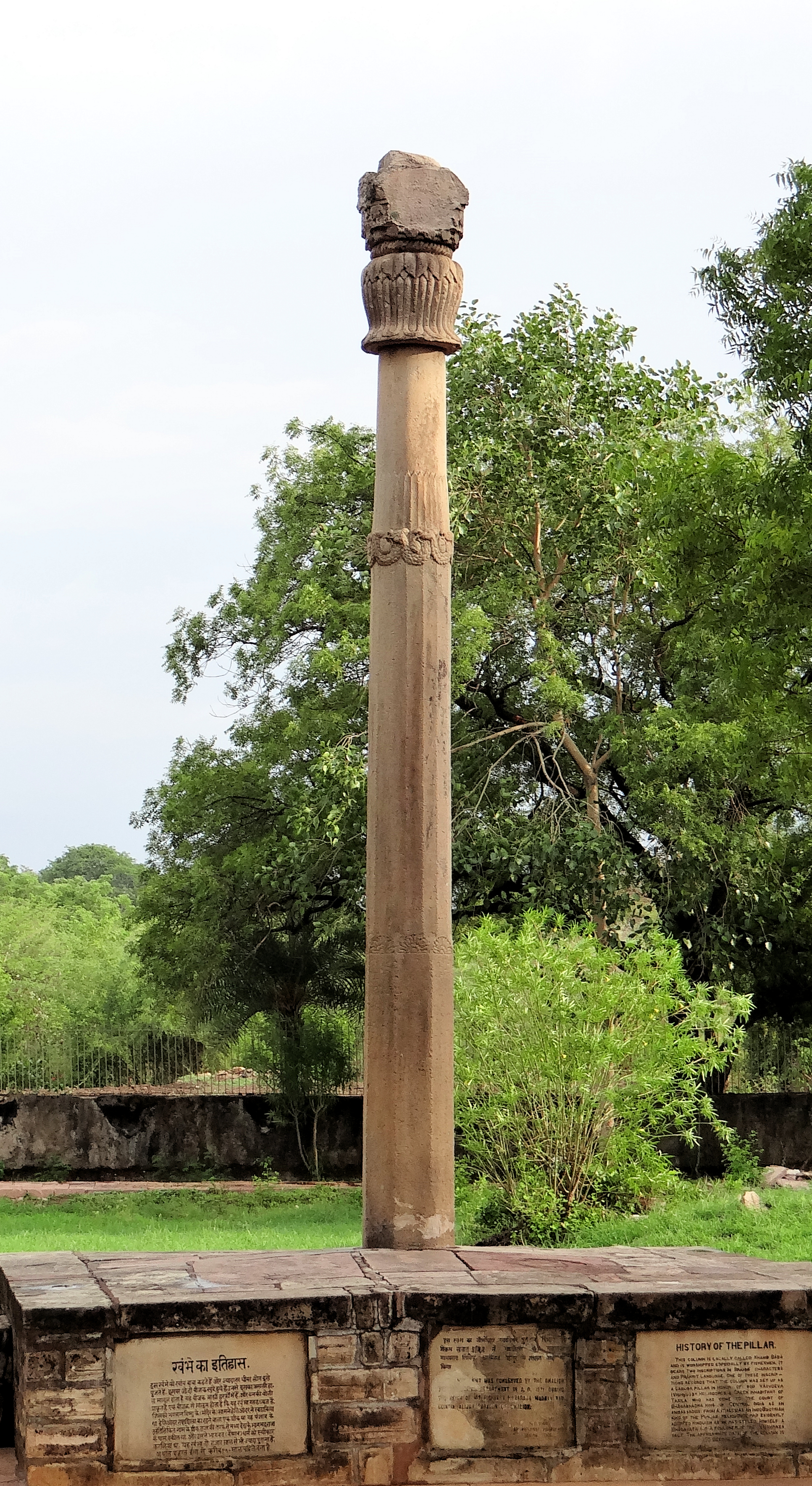
Heliodorus pillar, in northern part of Vidisha.

- Heliodorus pillar as known as Kham Baba is a stone column that was erected around 113 BCE. The pillar is commonly named after Heliodorus (Greek: Ηλιόδωρος) (identified by him as a Garuda-standard), who was an ambassador of the Indo-Greek king Antialcidas from Taxila, and was sent to the Indian ruler Bhagabhadra. A dedication written in Brahmi script was inscribed on the pillar, venerating Vāsudeva (Krishna), the Deva deva the "God of Gods" and the Supreme Deity. The pillar also glorifies the Indian ruler as "Bhagabhadra the savior". The pillar is a stambha which symbolizes joining earth, space and heaven, and is thought to connote the "cosmic axis" and express the cosmic totality of the Deity. The Heliodorus pillar site is located near the confluence of two rivers, about 60 kilometres (37 mi) northeast from Bhopal, 11 kilometres (6.8 mi) from the Buddhist stupa of Sanchi, and 4 kilometres (2.5 mi) from the Hindu Udayagiri site. The pillar was discovered by Alexander Cunningham in 1877. Two major archaeological excavations in the 20th-century have revealed the pillar to be a part of an ancient Vāsudeva temple site. Aside from religious scriptures such as the Bhagavad Gita, the epigraphical inscriptions on the Heliodorus pillar and the Hathibada Ghosundi Inscriptions contain some of the earliest known writings of Vāsudeva-Krishna devotion and early Vaishnavism and are considered the first archeological evidence of its existence. The pillar has been called one of the earliest surviving records of a foreign convert into Vaishnavism. An alternative interpretation is that making dedications to foreign gods was only a logical practice for the Greeks, intended to appropriate their local power and cannot be regarded as a "conversion" to Hinduism.
- Lohangi Pir is a rock formation in Vidisha District that derives its name from Shaykh Jalal Chishti, a saint who was locally known as Lohangi Pir. This small domed building is a tomb, which has two Persian inscriptions on it. One of the inscriptions dates back to 1460 CE, while the other is from 1583 CE. The tank and a large bell-capital dating back to the 1st century BCE can be seen on the nearby hill. Near the tomb are the remains of a medieval temple that survived as a pillared crypt. These are dedicated to Annapurna. Lohangi is a large rock right in the heart of Vidisha, within walking distance of the railway station, is of religious and historical significance in the region.

== Vidisha District Museum ==
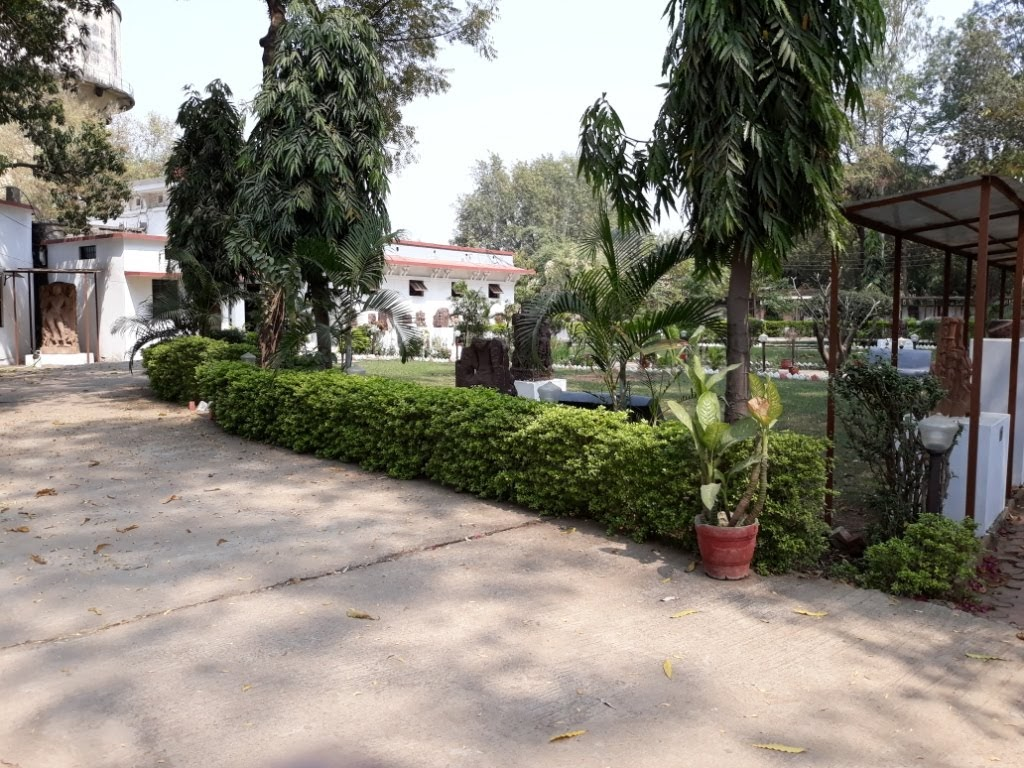
Vidisha District Museum.

Vidisha Museum or Vidisha District Museum is the main museum of the district and city of Vidisha. It is situated in the center of the city and about 400 meters away from Samrat Ashok Technological Institute (SATI).

The museum has many sculptures, terracottas and coins, especially from the 9th to the 10th century CE, as well as Harrappan art.

== Economy ==
=== Agriculture ===
Agriculture is the primary economic activity, with most of the population engaged in farming.Major crops include wheat, soybean, maize, pulses, and oilseeds.

Much of the district lies within the Betwa River basin, providing ample irrigation facilities. The majority of the population depends on agriculture.

=== Industrial areas ===
Jambar Bagri Industrial Area (also listed as Jambar Bagari Industrial Park) is an industrial zone located near Vidisha in the Vidisha district of Madhya Pradesh, India. Developed and managed by the Madhya Pradesh Industrial Development Corporation (MPIDC) along with the District Trade and Industries Centre (DTIC), the park serves as a manufacturing hub supporting small and medium-scale enterprises (SMEs) in the region.

Situated with road access to Bhopal (approximately 55–60 km away) and rail connectivity via Vidisha railway station, the industrial estate is divided into six planned industrial sectors—Sector A, B, C, D, E, and F—equipped with dedicated power distribution, internal road networks, and water supply infrastructure.

The industrial area hosts units across agro-processing, chemicals, and infrastructure engineering. Notable manufacturing and processing units operating in the park include:

- Engineering & Infrastructure: Seismoflex Private Limited (bridge bearings, expansion joints, drainage spouts, and metal beam crash barriers) and Real Group.
- Agro & Food Processing: HOAC Foods India Ltd, Maa Vijasen Agri Food Processors Private Limited, Sanchi Agro, Akankshi Foods, R.C. Agro, and Hi-Grow Tech.
- Chemicals & Allied Industries: National Chemicals.

== Transport ==
=== Road ===
National Highway 146 connects Vidisha to Bhopal (about 66 km) in the south-west, Raisen (about 25 km) in the south and Gyaraspur (about 36 km), Rahatgarh (about 75 km) and Sagar (about 111 km) in the north-east. National Highway 346 connects the city to Berasia (about 45 km) in the west and Ganj Basoda (about 52 km), Kurwai (about 83 km), Mungaoli (about 122 km) and Chanderi (about 159 km) in the north.

State Highway 19 connects the city to Bhind and Datia in the north, Bhopal (about 57 km) in the south-west and Chhindwara in the south. State Highway 29 starts from the city itself and connects to Garhi (about 42 km) and Gairatganj (about 50 km) in the east.

=== Rail ===
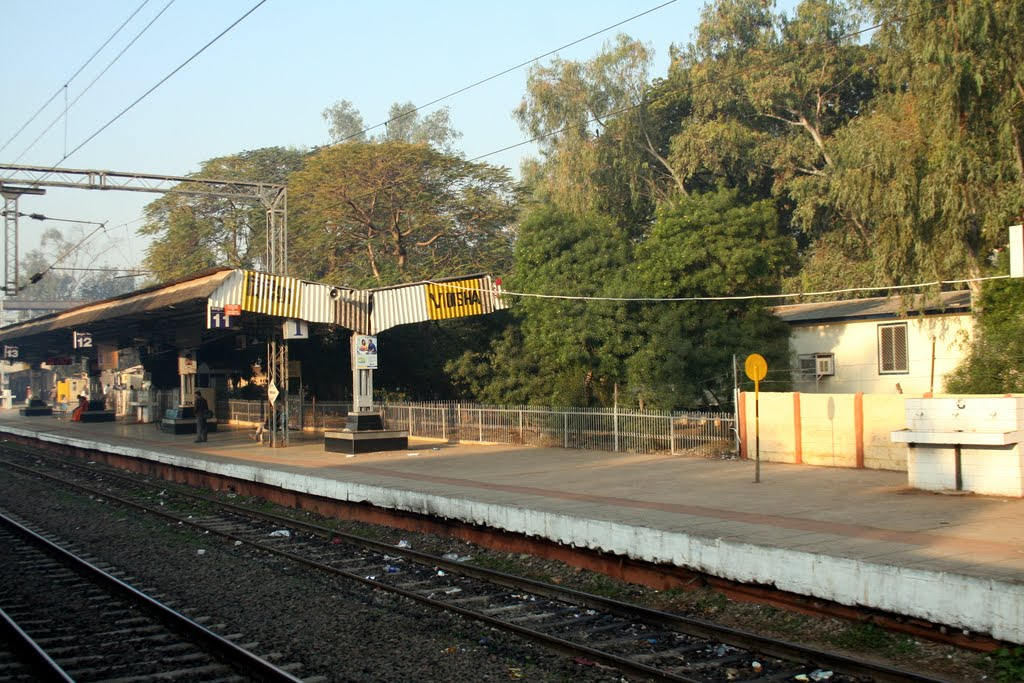
View of platform No.1

Vidisha railway station is a railway station on the Delhi-Chennai, Delhi-Mumbai main line of the Central Railway, at a distance of 54 km from Bhopal, the capital of Madhya Pradesh. Sanchi on the Jhansi-Itarsi section of the West Central Railway and Bhopal to Bina triple electrified broad gauge lines, from Bina to Katni double electrified Lines, Vidisha 102 km from Bina, and Vidisha, 9 km from Sanchi, are more convenient.

== Education ==
Vidisha has many primary and secondary schools affiliated with the Madhya Pradesh Board of Secondary Education and Central Board of Secondary Education (CBSE).

There is a Grant-in-Aid Autonomous College Samrat Ashok Technological Institute (SATI).

Atal Bihari Vajpayee Government Medical College, a medical college became functional in 2018 and received its first batch of students in the same year. The number of students admitted in 2018 was 150 whereas in 2019 the intake was increased to 180. Students are admitted to the college through NEET-UG examination.

== Notable people ==
=== Historic ===
- Maharani Devi (wife of Ashoka) – According to the Ceylonese chronicles, Ashoka's first wife was the daughter of a merchant of Vedisagiri (present-day Vidisha), Devi by name, whom Ashoka had married while he was Viceroy at Ujjain.

=== Social works ===
- Kailash Satyarthi – Born as Kailash Sharma in the Vidisha district, he is an Indian social reformer.
- Atul Shah – He is a social worker and a key figure in multiple Non Governmental Organisations which includes Lions club Vidisha and Red cross Society Vidisha

=== Education ===
- Pritam Babu Sharma – Indian academic and Vice Chancellor of Amity University, Gurgaon and ex Vice Chancellor of Delhi Technological University.

=== Art and sports ===
- Surendra Malviya – Indian Cricketer.
- Aalok Shrivastav – Indian Writer, Lyricist.

=== Politicians ===
- Atal Vihari Vajpayee – India's 10th Prime Minister represented Vidisha Lok Sabha constituency as an MP in 2nd, 5th, 6th and 7th Lok sabha.
- Mukesh Tandon – Politician, MLA of Madhya Pradesh legislative assembly from Vidisha 144 Constituency.
- Munvvar Saleem – Politician, MP of Rajya Sabha for Uttar Pradesh.
- Pratap Bhanu Sharma – Indian Politician, MP of 7th and 8th Lok Sabha from Vidisha Lok Sabha constituency.
- Raghavji – Indian Politician, MP of Lok Sabha and Rajya Sabha.
- Sushma Swaraj — won the Vidisha constituency in Madhya Pradesh for a second term In the 2014 Lok Sabha Election retaining her seat.

== See also ==
- List of cities in Madhya Pradesh
- List of cities in Madhya Pradesh by population
