= Government Girls PG College, Ujjain =

College in Madhya Pradesh

- Other names: Girls PG College
- Type: State Government Supported
- Established: 1959
- Affiliations: UGC, Vikram University, NAAC
- Principal: Dr Anita Manchandia
- Academic staff: 40
- Location: Ujjain, Madhya Pradesh, India
- Campus: Urban
- Website: www.mphighereducation.nic.in/Ujjain

Government Girls PG College, Ujjain, also known by the shorter names as Girls PG College, Ujjain or Girls PG College, is a government Girls college located in Ujjain, Madhya Pradesh, India. It is recognized by the University Grants Commission (UGC) and affiliated to Vikram University. it is accredited A grade by the National Assessment and Accreditation Council(NAAC)
