= Government Madhav Science College, Ujjain =

College in Madhya Pradesh

Government Science College, Ujjain
- Other names: Madhav Science College
- Type: State Government Supported
- Established: 1892
- Affiliations: UGC, Vikram University, NAAC
- Principal: Dr. Arpan Bhardwaj
- Academic staff: 16
- Location: Ujjain, Madhya Pradesh, India; 23.160°N 75.806°E
- Campus: Urban
- Website: www.madhavsciencecollegeujjain.com

Government Madhav Science College, Ujjain, also known by the shorter names as Madhav Science College, Ujjain or Madhav Science College, is a government college located in Ujjain, Madhya Pradesh, India. It is recognized by the University Grants Commission (UGC) and affiliated to Vikram University. it is accredited A++ grade by the National Assessment and Accreditation Council(NAAC)
