= Samrat Vikramaditya Government Law College, Ujjain =

- Samrat Vikramaditya Shaaskiy Vidhi Mahavidhyalay, Ujjain
- Type: Law College
- Established: 2014
- Principal: Satyanaryan Sharma
- Academic staff: 2
- Undergraduates: 160 per annum
- Postgraduates: 30 per annum
- Location: Ujjain, Madhya Pradesh, 456001, India; 23.149°N 75.817°E
- Campus: Urban
- Language: English, Hindi
- Website: www.mphighereducation.nic.in/ins1580

Samrat Vikramaditya Government Law College, Ujjain (Hindi: Samrat Vikramaditya Shaaskiy Vidhi Mahavidhyalay, Ujjain) is a government college affiliated to Vikram University in the center of Ujjain, India. The college offers 160 LL.B seats and 30 LL.M seats annually. According to the institute's website, it is not accredited by the Bar Council of India & National Assessment and Accreditation Council (NAAC) nor registered with the University Grants Commission (UGC).
