= Vikram University Sports Complex =

Sports complex in Ujjain, India

Coordinates: 23°09′33″N 75°48′40″E

- Vikram University Ground
- Interactive map of Vikram University Sports Complex
- Full name: Vikram University Sports Complex
- Location: Ujjain, India
- Owner: Vikram University
- Operator: Vikram University
- Capacity: 1,000

Construction
- Opened: 1960

Vikram University Sports Complex is a multipurpose sports complex located in Ujjain, Madhya Pradesh. The stadium managed and owned by Vikram University.

The stadium has facilities for various sports, including cricket, football, and hockey. There are also facilities for indoor sports such as basketball, badminton, gymnastics, handball, volleyball, lawn tennis, table tennis, weight lifting, and kabaddi. The stadium has hosted few non-first-class cricket matches.
