= V. K. Chaturvedi =

Indian mechanical engineer and nuclear power expert

- Born: India
- Occupations: Mechanical engineer Nuclear power expert
- Awards: Padma Shri

Vijay Kumar Chaturvedi is an Indian mechanical engineer and a nuclear power expert. He is the former Chairman and Managing Director of the Nuclear Power Corporation of India Limited (NPCIL). He did his graduate studies in mechanical engineering at Vikram University- Samrat Ashok Technological Institute in 1965 and secured a master's degree in nuclear engineering from Bhabha Atomic Research Centre Training School, Trombay.

After superannuating from NPCIL, Chaturvedi joined the Reliance Industries, served in such various capacities as that of a Director of New Power of Reliance Energy Limited, a Non-Executive of Reliance Power Limited, Director of the New Power at Reliance Infrastructure Limited and as a Non-Executive Director of Reliance Infrastructure Limited and serves the company as a member of its various committees.

Chaturvedi is a former member of the Atomic Energy Commission of India and has chaired the Tokyo Centre of the World Association of Nuclear Operators (WANO). He has also been a member of the Board of Governors of WANO for two years. In 2001, the Government of India awarded him the Padma Shri, the fourth-highest civilian award in India.

== See also ==
- Atomic Energy Commission of India
- World Association of Nuclear Operators
