= Atal Bihari Vajpayee Government Medical College =

Government College in Vidisha, Madhya Pradesh, India

Coordinates: 23.516°N 77.801°E

Atal Bihari Vajpayee Government Medical College & Hospital, Vidisha
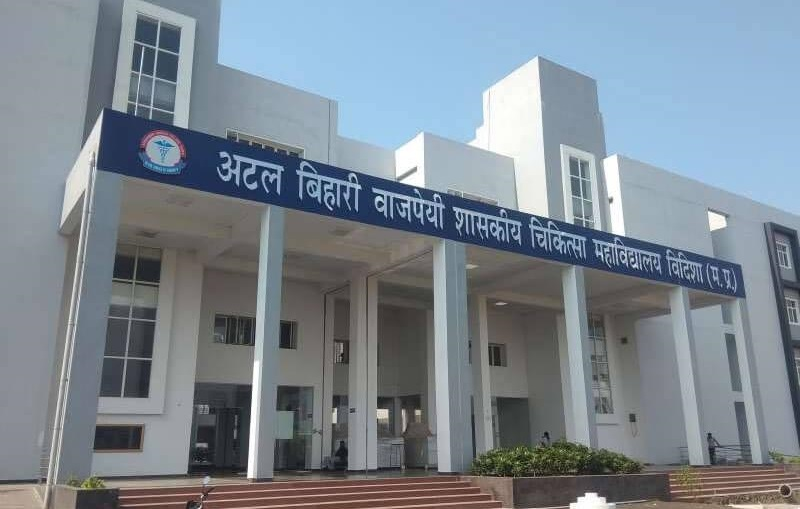
- Type: Medical college and tertiary hospital
- Established: 2018; 8 years ago
- Academic affiliations: Madhya Pradesh Medical Science University
- Dean: Dr. Manish Nigam
- Location: In front of Khel Parisar, Sanchi road, Vidisha, Madhya Pradesh, India
- Website: gmcvidisha.org

Atal Bihari Vajpayee Government Medical College (Hindi: अटल बिहारी वाजपेयी शास्किय चिकित्सा महाविद्यालय) is a government medical college in Vidisha, Madhya Pradesh. It was established in 2018. The college offers the degree of Bachelor of Medicine and Bachelor of Surgery (MBBS). Nursing and para-medical courses are also offered. The college is affiliated to Madhya Pradesh Medical Science University and is recognized by Medical Council of India (now NMC). The selection to the college is done on the basis of merit through National Eligibility and Entrance Test. The number of students admitted in 2018 was 150 whereas in 2019 the batch strength was increased to 180 students.

Following hospital is associated with the college-

- Atal Bihari Vajpayee Government Medical College & Hospital, Vidisha

== Location ==
The college is located in front of khel parisar, Sanchi road, Vidisha, Madhya Pradesh.

== Campus ==
The campus has following-

- Main college building
- Affiliated hospital (ABVGMC&H)
- Central Library
- Rain Basera (for patients and their relatives stay)
- Residential complex (for students, residents, professors, nurses, dean and medical superintendent)
- Guest House & Gym
- Sports ground (Khel Parisar- opposite the college campus)
- Badminton court (within college building)
- Central Virology Lab

== Courses ==
ABVGMC undertakes the education and training of students MBBS courses. From 2021, it also started the diploma and certificate paramedical courses.
