= Stony Brook University Research and Development Park =

The Stony Brook University Research and Development Park is a research and development park located in Stony Brook, New York owned by Stony Brook University, which acquired the land through eminent domain in 2005. The park is located a mile from the center of campus along Stony Brook Road on an area spanning over 240 acres in size.

== History of the land ==
The land was originally owned by St. James Gyrodyne Company of America and acquired by the university in a controversial eminent domain case in which the courts decided against the state's $26 million appraisal in support of the owner's $126 million valuation and later denied the state's request for appeal. The state ended up paying $167.5 million in a lawsuit settlement in 2012
