= CEWIT (Stony Brook University) =

Center for Excellence in Wireless and Information Technology
- Stony Brook University Research and Development Park, Stony Brook University, Stony Brook, New York

Information
- Other name: CEWIT
- Established: 2003
- School district: Stony Brook University
- Director: Satya Sharma
- Event 1: Hack@CEWIT
- Event 2: Radar Science Summer School

The Center for Excellence in Wireless and Information Technology (CEWIT) was established in 2003 as the main structure in the SUNY Stony Brook University Research and Development Park, They opened the new and current building in March 2009

As of 2023 the center has over 70 associated faculty members, and more than 200 Ph.D./M.S. students conducting research.

== Research areas ==
"The Center’s research areas are diverse, [with] research topics [that] range from materials to components to systems and address devices and communications, networking, software systems, and solutions/applications for vertical markets." -

- Distributed Robotics
- Expressive and Hybrid Networks
- Mobile Computing
- Wireless Networks
- Cyber Security
- Computer Vision and Image Processing
- RF Systems
- Microwave Sensors
- Wireless Sensor Networks
- Computational Genetics and Protein Docking
- Computational Neurobiology
- Virtual Reality
- Effective Bandwidth Utilization
- Wireless Protocols
- Wireless Ad Hoc Networks and Wireless Gateways

== Events ==
Radar Science Summer School: On July 22, 2023, CEWIT hosted 25 Under Graduate Student From the U.S. & abroad for their first ever Radar Science Summer School.

Hack@CEWIT: An annual student event run by CEWIT, where More than 300 college students from across the U.S. take part in a 43-hour hackathon. The 2023 Hackathon was the 7th Annual Hackathon with the theme Hacking a Sustainable Future.
