= Partha Sarthi Sen Sharma =

IAS Officer

- Born: June 30, 1970 (age 55); Malda, West Bengal, India
- Education: Bachelor of Technology
- Alma mater: Delhi Technological University
- Occupation: IAS officer
- Years active: 1994–present
- Employer: Government of India
- Organization: Indian Administrative Service

Partha Sarthi Sen Sharma (born; 30 June 1970) is an Indian Civil Servant and author. As a career bureaucrat he joined the Indian Administrative Service (IAS) in 1994.

== Early life and education ==
Partha Sarthi was born in Malda, West Bengal on 30 June 1970. He has done his engineering from the Delhi College of Engineering (now Delhi Technical University).

== Career ==
He joined IAS in 1994. And as an author, Partha Sarthi Sen Sharma started contributing individual travel pieces to many publications like The Times of India, Hindustan Times, The Pioneer etc. long ago but his first full-length Travelogue book came out in 2011 as ‘A passage across Europe’ which has since been translated into Hindi as ‘Musafir Hun Yaaro’.

== Notable books ==
- Love: Side by Side (ISBN 8129137658)
- Love in Lucknow (ISBN 9390900689)
- Andamanush Nicobarese -: An Island Travenovel (ISBN 9355208677)
- Every Mile a Memory (ISBN 8129142309)
- Hum Hain Rahi Pyar Ke (ISBN 9351868044)
