= Madhav Institute of Technology and Science =

Institute in Gwalior, Madhya Pradesh, India

Madhav Institute of Technology & Science
- Former names: Madhav Engineering College, Gwalior
- Motto: Work Is Worship (कर्म ही पूजा है।)
- Type: Public
- Established: 1957; 69 years ago
- Chairman: Jyotiraditya Scindia
- Director: R. K. Pandit
- Location: Gwalior, Madhya Pradesh, India; 26.2326°N 78.2052°E
- Campus: Urban
- Website: mitsgwalior.in

Madhav Institute of Technology and Science, formerly known as Madhav Engineering College and commonly referred to as MITS Gwalior, is a government-aided autonomous institute founded in 1957 and located in Gwalior in the state of Madhya Pradesh, India. In the year 2024 the institute is declared "Deemed to be University" under Distinct Category by Ministry of Education, Government of India. The institute is operated by the Scindia Engineering College Society. The institute offers bachelor's, master's and doctoral degrees in engineering along with Bachelor in Architecture and Master's in Computer Application.

== History ==
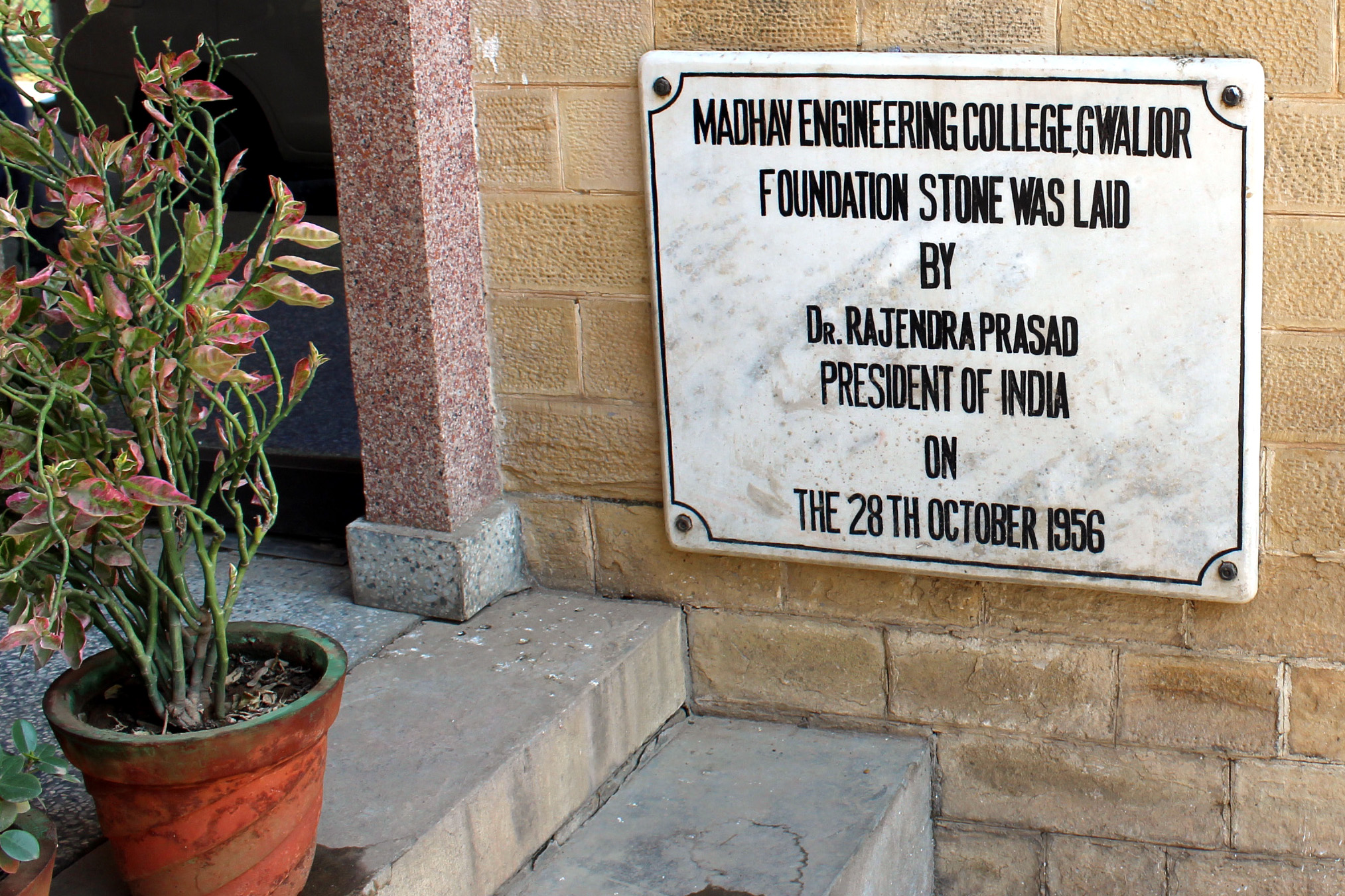
Foundation Stone

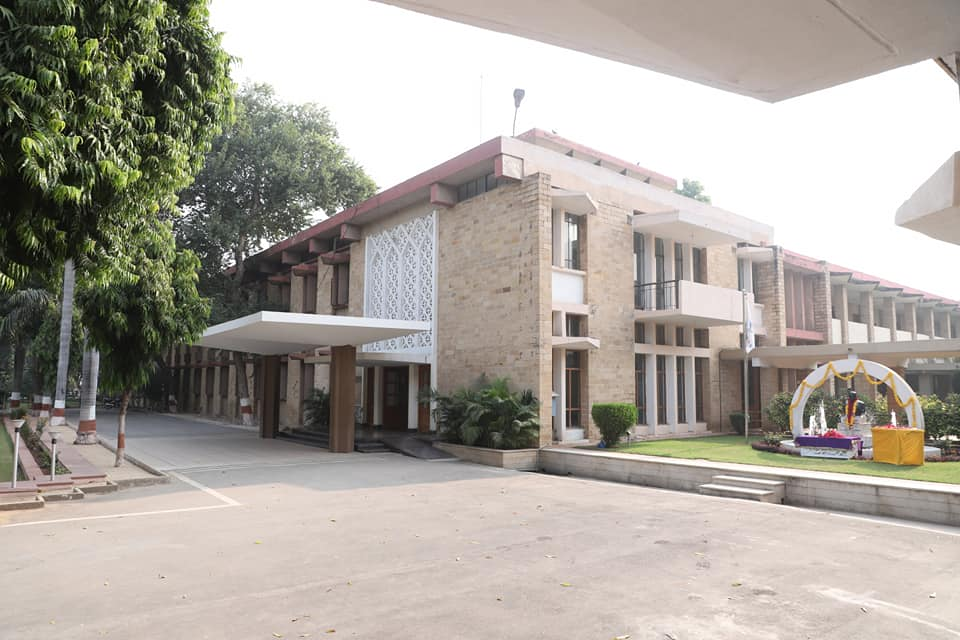
Front view of Madhav Institute of Technology & Science, Gwalior

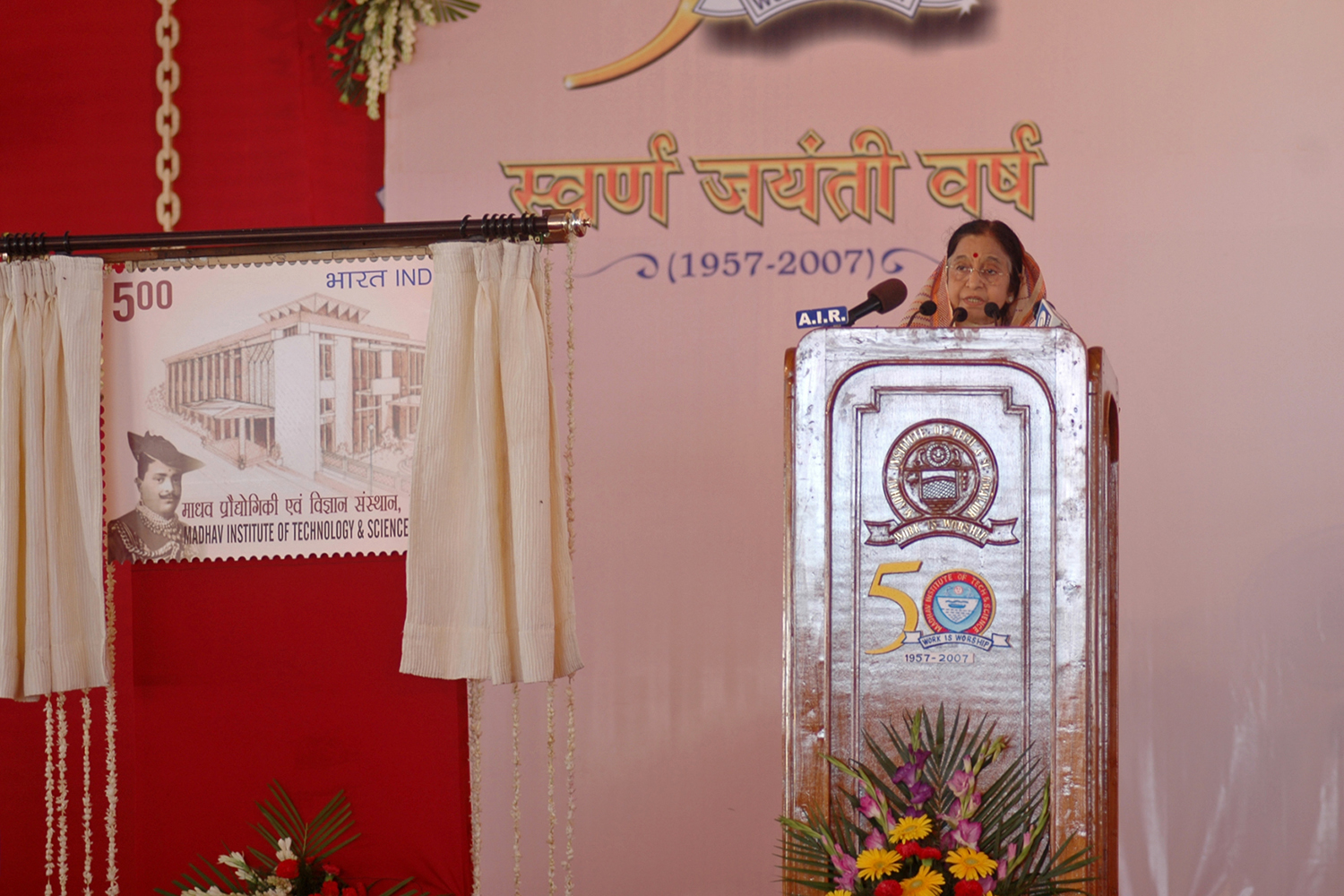
12th President of India Pratibha Patil at the Golden Jubilee celebration at MITS Gwalior in 2008

Madhav Engineering College was established in 1957 by Maharaja Jivajirao Scindia. The foundation stone of the institute was laid by Dr. Rajendra Prasad, the former President of India, on 20 October 1956. The building was inaugurated on 11 December 1964 by Dr. S. Radhakrishnan, the former President of India.

The institute started with Bachelor of Engineering courses in civil, mechanical and electrical engineering. Postgraduate and Ph.D. courses in applied sciences were introduced in 1967. Undergraduate courses in electronics engineering and architecture were started in 1981 and 1984 respectively. The institute started a postgraduate course in Computer Application in 1986.

The institute offered a postgraduate course in civil engineering with specialization in construction technology and management in 1987. Postgraduate degrees in electronics and electrical engineering were started in 1995. A Bachelor of Engineering in computer science and engineering and chemical engineering were offered from 1994 and 1995 respectively. An information technology course was started in 2000. The president of the governing body is Jyotiraditya Scindia, who is also a Member of Parliament.

== Campus ==
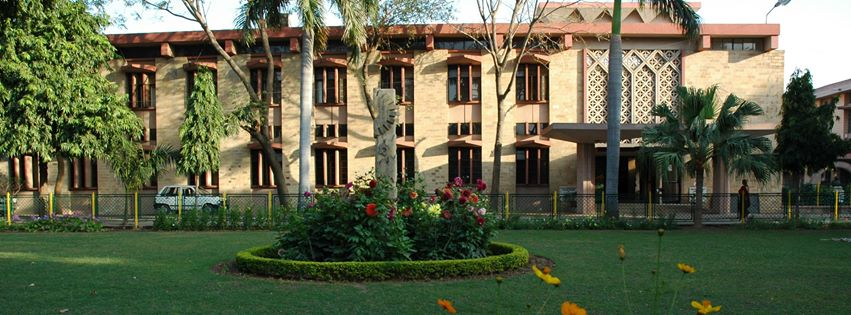
MITS Academic Block

The institute is located on Race Course Road, Gwalior and is 2 kilometres (1.2 mi) from Gwalior Junction railway station. The 47-acre (190,000 m^{2}) campus is surrounded by educational institutions such as the Lakshmibai National University of Physical Education and the Rajmata Vijayaraje Scindia Krishi Vishwavidyalaya. The campus is divided into two zones, a residential zone with five hostels (three for males and two for females) and an academic zone. The Student Activity Center is a part of the academic zone and is mainly intended for extra-curricular activities. The SAC has a music room, a fiberglass basketball court, cricket ground and a volleyball court. The campus has a Central Computer Library available 8 hrs for the students and faculty.

== Departments ==
MITS has several departments, with most focussing on a single engineering stream or science discipline:

- Architecture
- Automobile engineering
- Chemical engineering
- Civil engineering
- Computer science and engineering
- Electrical engineering
- Electronic engineering
- Humanities
- Information technology
- Management
- Mechanical engineering
- Mathematics and computing

== Academic programmes ==
The institute's undergraduate programmes include the Bachelor of Engineering programme. It offers postgraduate level programmes like Master of Engineering, Master of Science, and Master of Science (research). It offers a Ph.D. programme. The admission criteria for all these programmes is different at the entry level.

=== Undergraduate programmes ===
The institute offers a total of 500 seats for undergraduate programmes. There are also 15 seats for part-time students each in the civil engineering, electrical engineering and mechanical engineering departments. A Bachelor of Engineering is offered in ten areas; automobile, biotechnology, chemical, civil, computer science, electrical, electronics, electronics and telecommunication, information technology, and mechanical engineering. A Bachelor of Architecture is also offered. Admissions are through the Engineering Entrance Examination conducted by the Central Board of Secondary Education and counselling by the Directorate of Technical Education of Madhya Pradesh.

=== Postgraduate programmes ===
The institute offers postgraduate-level programmes in each department of engineering. There are a number of inter-disciplinary programmes available. At the postgraduate level, admissions are on the basis of the Graduate Aptitude Test in Engineering. Admissions to the Master of Computer Applications course is done on the basis of MP-MCA examination. Department of Management has full time 2 years of the Master of Business Administration (M.B.A.) program affiliated from the Jiwaji University, Gwalior.

== Cultural and non-academic activities ==
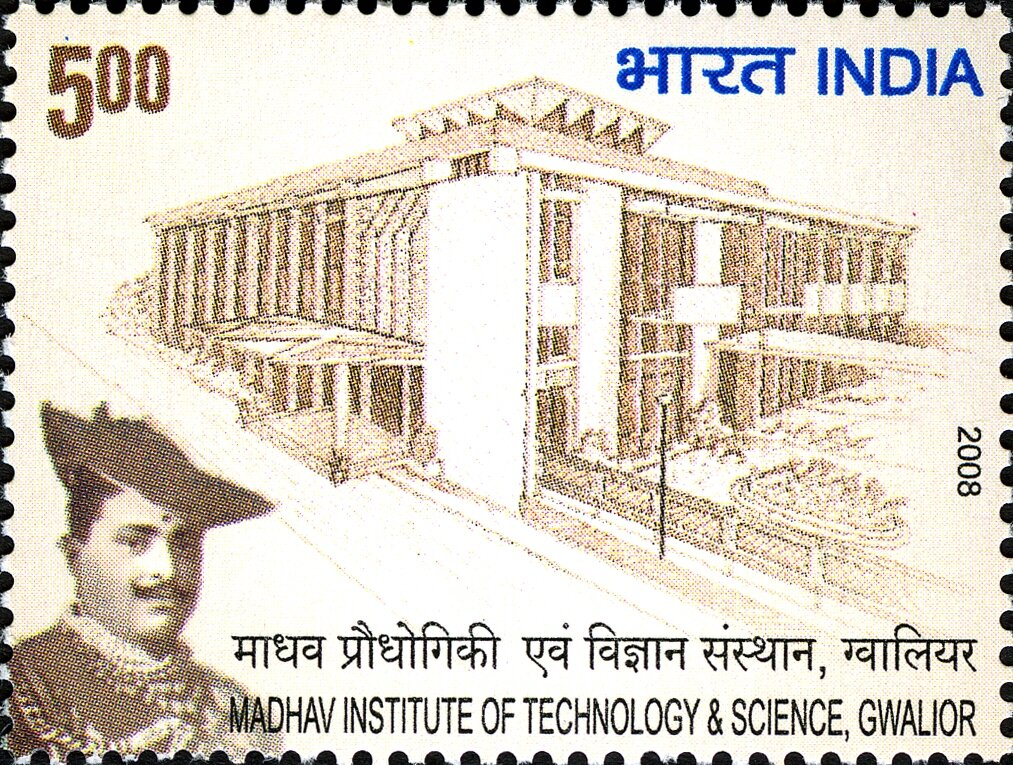
Madhav Institute of Technology - Science Gwalior Golden Jubilee commemorative postal stamp. 2008

Regular cultural and non-academics activities are organised by the students or the various departments of the institute. The most widely known event is Cyhper And Dy'signo, a carnival that attracts the participation of more than 1200 students from various schools, colleges and universities. In 2017 it was organised by TeamAudacious, a student chapter for enhancing technological aspects of the college. It also conducts a 2-day fest 'Abhudaya' organised by MITS Journalism Society as well as the literary carnival of Gwalior known as Mitsvah organised by the literary club of MITS known as Querencia.

== Notable alumni ==
- Raghunath Kashinath Shevgaonkar, former director of IIT Delhi
- Phool Singh Baraiya, Indian Politician, 2-times MLA from Bhander.
- S. K. Jain, chairman of the Governing Board of the World Association of Nuclear Operators (WANO)
- V. K. Saraswat, scientist, Padma Bhushan recipient
- Abhay Karandikar, full-time member of NITI Aayog, the Government of India, former Director IIT Kanpur
