= Raghunath Kashinath Shevgaonkar =

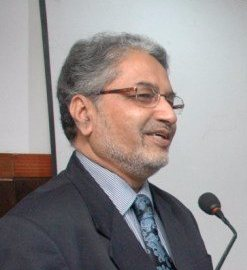

Raghunath Kashinath Shevgaonkar was named Fellow of the Institute of Electrical and Electronics Engineers (IEEE) in 2012 for leadership in electrical engineering education in India.

Shevgaonkar received his BA in engineering from MITS gwalior.

Shevgaonkar is former Director of IIT Delhi (2011 to 2015) and former Vice Chancellor of University of Pune.

Shevgaonkar is a recipient of the IEEE William Sayle Award for Academic Leadership 2013, the IETE Ram Lal Wadhwa Award 2012, the VASVIK Award for IT and Communication 2009 and the IETE - CEOT -94 Awards for outstanding contribution in the field of Photonics and Opto-electronics.
