= S. K. Jain =

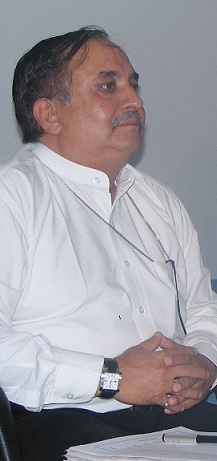
S K Jain

S. K. Jain was the chairman and managing director of the Nuclear Power Corporation of India from 2004 to 2012. In June 2012, Jain was elected chairman of the Governing Board of World Association of Nuclear Operators (WANO), Tokyo Centre.
