= Wireless gateway =

Gateway that routes packets from a wireless LAN to another network

A wireless gateway routes packets from a wireless LAN to another network, wired or wireless WAN. It may be implemented as software or hardware or a combination of both. Wireless gateways combine the functions of a wireless access point, a router, and often provide firewall functions as well. They provide network address translation (NAT) functionality, so multiple users can use the internet with a single public IP. It also acts like a dynamic host configuration protocol (DHCP) to assign IPs automatically to devices connected to the network.

There are two kinds of wireless gateways. The simpler kind must be connected to a DSL modem or cable modem to connect to the internet via the internet service provider (ISP). The more complex kind has a built-in modem to connect to the internet without needing another device. This converged device saves desk space and simplifies wiring by replacing two electronic packages with one. It has a wired connection to the ISP, at least one jack port for the LAN (usually four jacks), and an antenna for wireless users. The wireless gateway could support wireless 802.11b and 802.11g with speed up to 56 Mbit/s, 802.11n with speed up to 300Mps and recently the 802.11ac with speed up to 1200 Mbit/s. The LAN interface may support 100 Mbit/s (Fast) or 1000 Mbit/s (Gigabit) Ethernet.

All wireless gateways have the ability to protect the wireless network using security encryption methods such as WEP, WPA, and WPS. WPA2 with WPS disabled is the most secure method. There are many wireless gateway brands with models offering different features and quality. They can differ on the wireless range and speed, a number of LAN ports, speed, and extra functionality. Some available brands in the market are Motorola, Netgear, and Linksys. However, most internet providers offer a free wireless gateway with their services, thus limiting the user's choice. On the other hand, the device provided by the ISP has the advantage that it comes pre-configured and ready to be installed. Another advantage of using these devices is the ability of the company to troubleshoot and fix any problem via remote access, which is very convenient for most users.

== See also ==
- Wi-Fi
- IEEE 802.11
- Residential gateway
