= CEWiT (India) =

Indian research society

- Founded: 7 July 2004
- Type: Research organisation
- Location: IITM Research Park, Kanagam Road, Taramani, Chennai, Tamil Nadu, India
- Coordinates: 12.99091°N 80.24225°E
- Region served: Technology
- Product: Wireless Technology
- Key people: Department of Information Technology, IIT Madras, Indian Telecom Industry, TSDSI
- Website: www.cewit.org.in

Centre of Excellence in Wireless Technology (CEWiT) is a nonprofit research society of IIT Madras set up to research potential innovations in wireless technology. The organisation was set up with support from the Ministry of Communication and IT and the Indian telecom industry.

== Overview ==
CEWiT's research on broadband wireless technologies addresses a wide range of issues relating to air interface, core network & services, as well as actively contributing to 4G and 5G wireless standards, 3GPP LTE, LTE-Advanced, NR and IEEE 802.16m WiMAX.

In 2018, CEWiT, along with the Indian Institute of Technology Madras, Indian Institute of Technology Kanpur, Indian Institute of Technology Delhi, Indian Institute of Technology Hyderabad, Society for Applied Microwave Electronics Engineering and Research, and Indian Institute of Science received funding from the Indian Department of Telecommunications to build the indigenous 5G testbed for the Indian telecom market.
