= Amity University, Gurgaon =

Private university in Haryana, India

Coordinates: 28.3184502°N 76.9137212°E

Amity University, Gurugram
- Type: Private
- Established: 2010; 16 years ago
- Affiliations: UGC, IET, ASIC, ACBSP
- Chancellor: Dr. Aseem Chauhan
- Vice-Chancellor: Prof. P. B. Sharma
- Location: Pachgaon (Gurugram district), Haryana, India
- Website: amity.edu/gurugram

Amity University, Gurugram is a private university located in the Pachgaon cluster of villages, near Manesar, Gurugram district, Haryana, India. The university was established in 2010 by the Amity Education Group through The Haryana Private Universities (Amendment) Act, 2010.

== Academics ==
The university offers more than 100 programmes.

=== Accreditation ===
Amity University, Gurugram is recognized by the University Grants Commission (UGC). It is also accredited by the Accreditation Service for International Colleges (ASIC). The Amity School of Engineering and Technology is accredited with the Institution of Engineering and Technology (IET) and the Amity Business School is accredited by the Accreditation Council for Business Schools and Programs (ACBSP).

== Campus ==
The university campus is spread over 30 acres (0.12 km^{2}), including a 2 acres (8,100 m^{2}) sports complex. It houses more than 3,000 students.

== See also ==
- Amity United FC
