= TSDSI =

Telecommunications Standards Development Society, India (TSDSI) is the recognized organization for Telecommunications standards development in India, founded in November 2013. It is mainly intended to develop standards that are suitable to the Indian market. It recently signed up an agreement with ETSI.

== Aims ==
TSDSI aims at developing and promoting India-specific requirements, standardizing solutions for meeting requirements and contributing to international standards, contributing to global standardization in the field of telecommunications, maintaining the technical standards and other deliverables of the organization, safe-guarding the related IPR, helping create manufacturing expertise in the country, and providing leadership to the developing countries in terms of their telecommunications-related standardization needs.
