= Vikram University =

State University in Madhya Pradesh

Coordinates: 23.1647°N 75.8094°E

- Motto: Vidhaya Mritam Shrute
- Type: Public
- Established: 1957; 69 years ago
- Affiliations: UGC, AICTE, NAAC
- Chancellor: Governor of Madhya Pradesh
- Vice-Chancellor: Akhilesh Kumar Pandey
- Location: Ujjain, Madhya Pradesh, India
- Campus: Urban
- Website: vikramuniv.ac.in

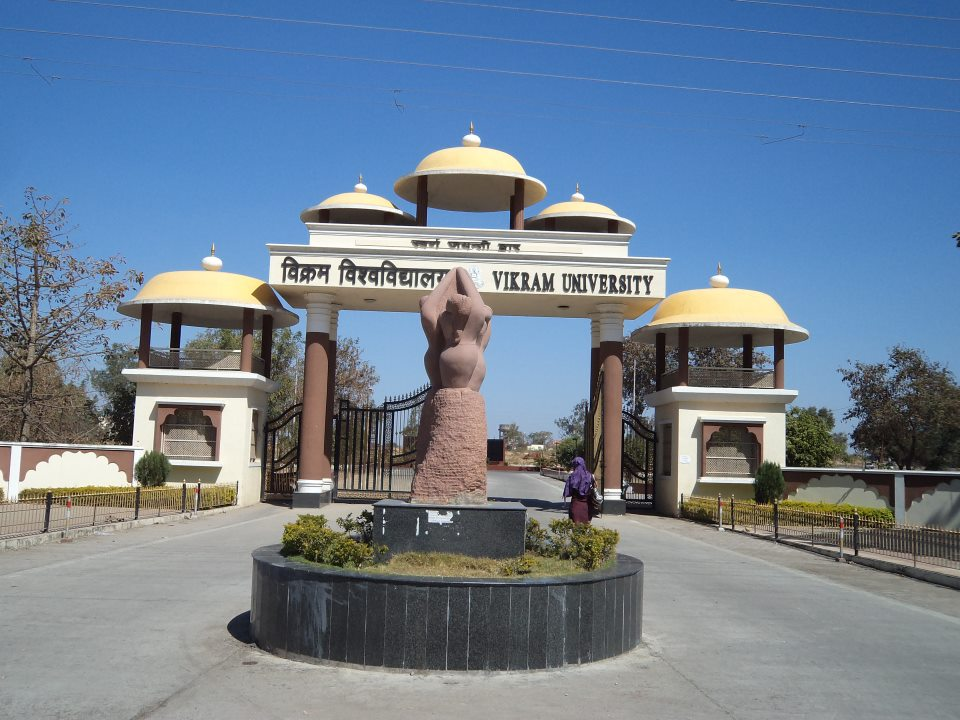
Swarna Jayanti Gate at University Campus

Vikram University is located in Ujjain, Madhya Pradesh, India.

The university was named after the ruler Vikramaditya. It was established in 1957. It was evaluated by the National Assessment and Accreditation Council and was awarded B++ grade.

The Madhya Pradesh Government has officially rechristened Vikram University as Samrat Vikramaditya University, honouring the legendary emperor. The announcement was made by CM Mohan Yadav at the 29th convocation on March 30, 2025.

== Notable alumni ==
- Kaptan Singh Solanki, former Governor of Punjab and Haryana
- Najma Heptulla, former Governor of Manipur
- Vijay Kumar Patodi, Indian mathematician
- V. K. Chaturvedi, mechanical engineer and a nuclear power expert
- Sachida Nagdev, contemporary Indian artist
- Raghunandan Sharma, politician
- Satyanarayan Jatiya, politician
