= Rohini (given name) =

- Pronunciation: /roʊˈhiːni/ roh-HI-nee; Hindi: [roːɦiːniː] Sanskrit: [roːɦiːniː]
- Gender: Female
- Language: Sanskrit

Origin
- Origin: Sanskrit
- Meaning: “star”, “ascending”, “growing”, “red one”
- Region of origin: Indian subcontinent

Other names
- Related names: Rohinee, Rohiṇī
- See also: Rohini (disambiguation)

Rohini (Rohiṇī) is a Sanskrit origin feminine name. The literal translation is “ascending”, “growing”, and “red one”.

== Etymology ==
The name is derived from the Sanskrit root roh (“to rise, grow, ascend”) plus the feminine suffix -inī.

In Hindu mythology, bearers include Rohinī Devi, the favourite consort of Chandra, and Rohinī, mother of Balarama and Subhadra in the Mahābhārata.

== People ==
The name is used across India, Sri Lanka, Nepal and the South‑Asian diaspora. Notable people with the given name include:

- Rohini Arora, Canadian politician
- Rohini Balakrishnan, Indian bioacoustics expert
- Rohini Banerjee, Indian actress and model
- Rohini Bhate (1924 – 2008), Indian Kathak dancer and scholar
- Rohini Chowdhury (born 1963), Indian author and literary translator
- Rohini Kumar Chaudhuri (1899–1955), Indian politician
- Rohini Sindhuri Dasari (born 1984), Indian bureaucrat
- Rohini Devasher, Indian contemporary artist
- Rohini Godbole (1952 – 2024), Indian particle physicist
- Rohini Hattangadi (born 1951), Indian actor, BAFTA winner for Gandhi
- Rohini Mariam Idicula, Indian actress, anchor and model
- Rohini Khadilkar (born 1963), Indian chess player
- Rohini Khadse-Khewalkar (born 1982), Indian politician
- Rohini Kuner (born 1970), Indian-born German pharmacologist and academic
- Rohini Marasinghe, Sri Lankan puisne justice of the Supreme Court
- Rohini Mohan, Indian musician and artist
- Rohini Mohan, Indian journalist and writer
- Rohini Molleti (born 1969), Indian actress, screenwriter, dubbing artist and lyricist
- Rohini Nanayakkara Sri Lankan banker
- Rohini Nilekani (born 1960), Indian author and philanthropist
- Rohini Pande, Indian economist
- Kodavatiganti Rohini Prasad (1949–2012), Indian author and scientist
- Rohini Salian (born 1947), Indian lawyer and prosecutor
- Rohini Somanathan (born 1965), Indian economist
- Rohini Kesavan Srihari, American computer scientist and entrepreneur
- Rohini Kumari Wijerathna, Sri Lankan politician

== See also ==
- Rohini (Buddha's disciple)
- Rohini (goddess)
- Rohini (wife of Vasudeva)
- Gloria Rohini (born 1955), Indian judge
- Rohini (disambiguation)
