= Agaraju =

King of Kosambi in the 1st century BCE

King of Kosambi
- Reign: 1st century BCE
- Successor: Agnimitra
- Issue: Dhanabhuti
- Father: Gargiputra Visvadeva

Agaraju (Agarāju; reigned 1st century BCE) was a king of Kosambi. While he is known as Agaraju in his coins, he was also known as Angārajyut. He was part of the Mitra dynasty of Kosambi.

== Name ==
Many of the rulers of Mitra dynasty bear the suffix "-mitra" in their names.

== Genealogy ==
A genealogy constructed from the Bharhut inscriptions suggest he may have been father of Dhanabhuti, who is known for the Bharhut inscriptions. Visvadeva would be father of Agaraju.

He is considered to be an early ruler in the dynasty.

== Coinage ==
Most rulers of the Mitra dynasty of Kosambi, except Radhamitra, have the symbol known as the tree-in-railing in their coins. Another common symbol is the Ujjain symbol. Bull is a common animal to appear on the coinage of Kosambi of the era.
