= Rohini =

Rohini may refer to:

== People ==
- Rohini (given name), including a list of persons and characters with the name
- Rohini (actress) (born 1969), Indian actress, screenwriter, and director
- Rohini (Buddha's disciple), female disciple
- Rohini (goddess), consort of Chandra
- Rohini (Krishna's wife), queen of Hindu god Krishna
- Rohini Devi, first consort of Vasudeva in Hindu mythology
- Rohini Hattangadi (born 1955), Indian actress
- Rohini Nanayakkara, retired bank executive from Sri Lanka

== Places ==
- Rohini, West Bengal, a village in India
- Rohini, Delhi, a residential sub city in Northwest Delhi, India

== Other ==
- Rohini (film), a 1953 Indian Tamil-language film directed by Kamal Ghosh
- Rohini (nakshatra), a lunar mansion in Indian astronomy corresponding to Aldebaran
- Rohini (satellite), a series of Indian space satellites
- Rohini sounding rocket series, Indian rockets developed for meteorological and atmospheric study purposes
- Rohini River, in South Central Nepal, tributary to the West Rapti River
