= Kharavela =

Emperor of Kalinga

- Chakravartin; Kalingadhipati; Maharaja

Emperor of Kalinga
- Tenure: 2nd or 1st century BCE
- Predecessor: possibly Vriddharaja (a.k.a. Vudharaja)
- Successor: Kudepasiri
- Born: c. 2nd century BCE; Kalinga,(Present day Odisha, India)
- Spouse: Sindhula of Sampath
- Issue: Kudepasiri
- Dynasty: Mahameghavahana
- Religion: Jainism

Kharavela (Note: also transliterated Khārabēḷa) was the emperor of Kalinga (present-day eastern coast of India) in the 2nd or 1st century BC. The primary source for Kharavela is his rock-cut Hathigumpha inscription. The inscription is undated, only four of its 17 lines are completely legible, others unclear, variously interpreted and disputed by scholars. The inscription is written in Brahmi script with Jainism-related phrases recites a year by year record of his reign. He was a follower of Jainism.

Kharavela is known for his military campaigns in Northern and Southern India. He has led victorious expeditions against Magadha, Satavahana and Tamil confederacy (led by Pandya dynasty) and other kingdoms such as Rashtrikas and Bhojakas of Berar and Maharastra regions during his reign.

He undertook public works for the benefit of his people and in order to please them he remitted taxes and provided them with the occasions for merrymakings. The Hathigumpha inscription also mentions his public works such as repairing of the gates and buildings of his capital Kalinganagara, which was destroyed by a storm. These repairs and some other public works in the same year cost him thirty-five hundred thousand coins.

== Early life ==
=== Lineage ===
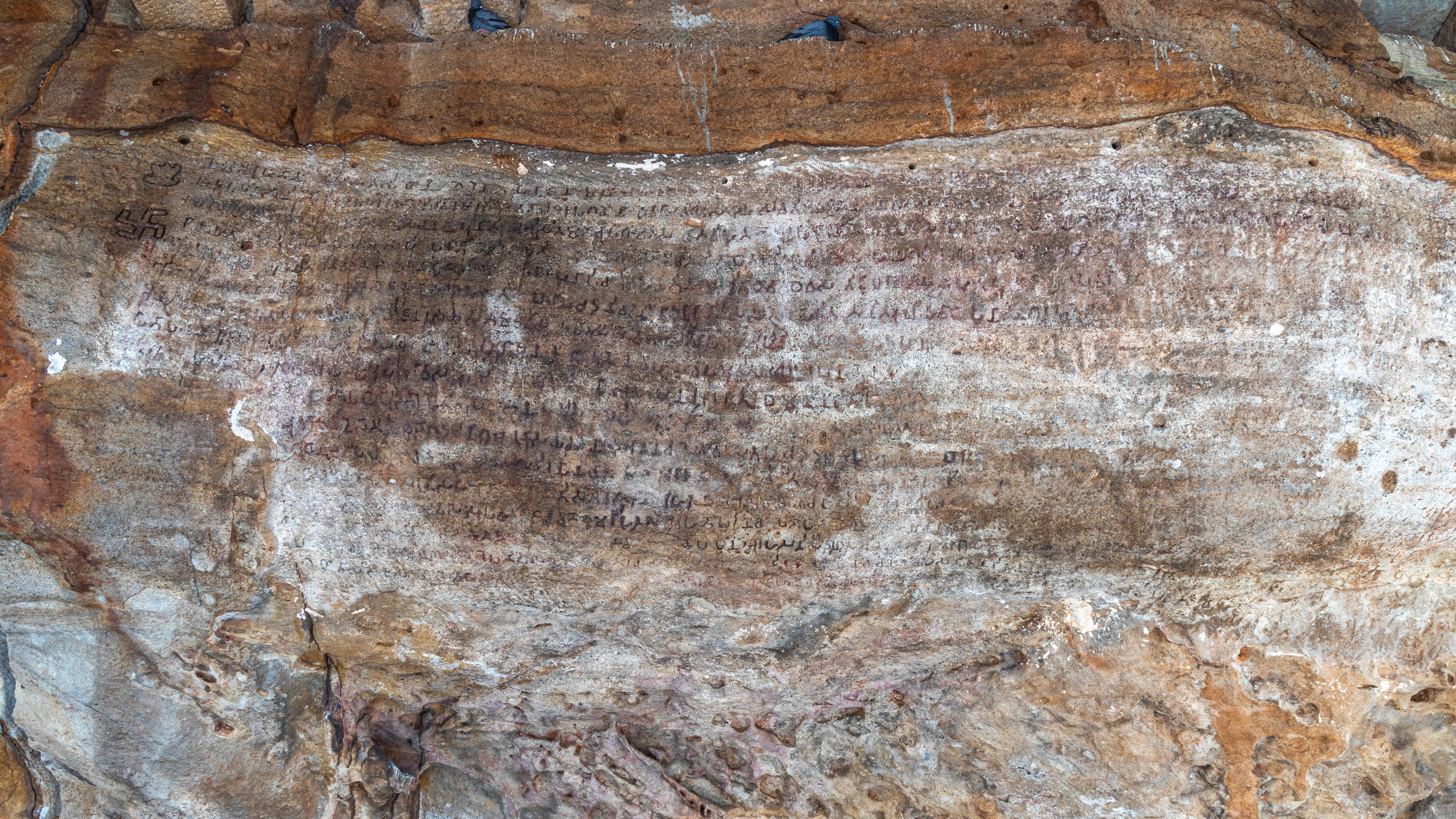
Hāthigumphā inscription of Kharavela

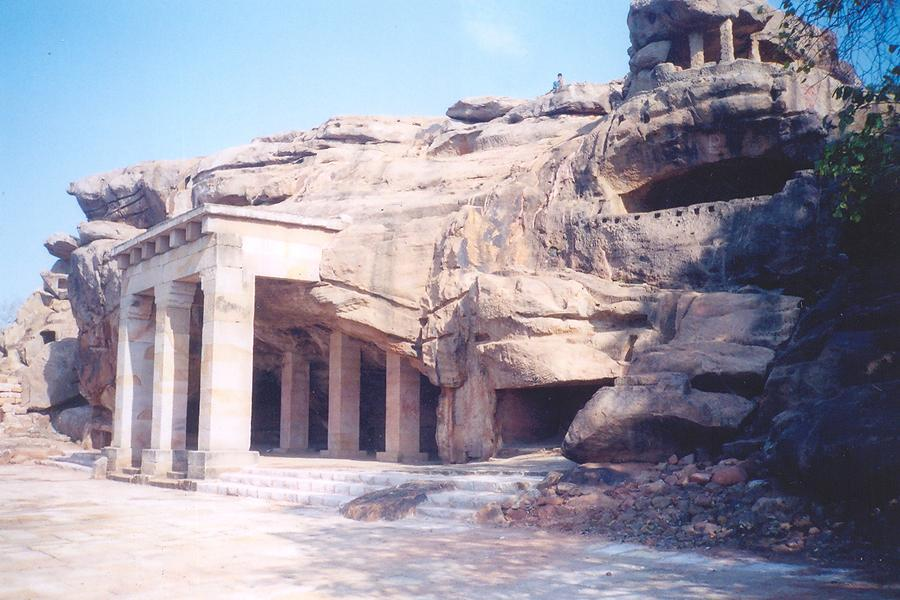
The Hathigumpha cave, one of the Udayagiri and Khandagiri Caves

The first line of the Hathigumpha inscription calls Kharavela "Chetaraja-vasa-vadhanena" (चेतराज वस वधनेन, "the one who extended the family of the Cheta King"). R. D. Banerji and D. C. Sircar interpreted "Cheti" (चेति) to be referring to a dynasty from which Kharavela descended, namely Chedi mahajanapada. According to Sahu, this is incorrect and an artifact of a crack in the stone. The "Chetaraja", states Sahu, probably refers to Kharavela's father and his immediate predecessor.

The Hathigumpha inscription also contains a word that has been interpreted as Aira or Aila. According to a small inscription found in the Mancapuri Cave, Kharavela's successor Kudepasiri also styled himself as Aira Maharaja Kalingadhipati Mahameghavahana (Devanagari: ऐर महाराजा कलिंगाधिपतिना महामेघवाहन). Early readings of that inscription by scholars such as James Prinsep and R. L. Mitra interpreted Aira as the name of the king in the Hathigumpha inscription. Indraji's work corrected this error, and established that the king mentioned in the Hathugumpha inscription was Kharavela and that he was a descendant of Mahameghavahana. It does not directly mention the relationship between Mahameghavahana and Kharavela, or the number of kings between them. Indraji interpreted the inscription to create a hypothetical family tree in 1885, but this is largely discredited.

The word Aira or Aila was then re-interpreted by Barua and Sahu to be the Prakrit form of the Sanskrit word Arya ("noble"). Jayaswal and Banerji interpret the same word to be referring to the Aila dynasty, the mythical Pururavas dynasty mentioned in Hindu and Jain texts; Kharavela's Mahameghavahana family might have claimed descent from this Pururavas dynasty. Scholars such as Sircar and Sharma, based on later discovered Guntupalli inscriptions, state that Kharavela was one of the ancient Mahameghavahana dynasty king from Kalinga.

=== Education ===
Kharavela was raised from his early years to develop the qualities required of a king. The Hathigumpha Inscription, through its panegyrist, portrays him as a person endowed with many good qualities of mind and character, and his training was directed toward shaping him into a capable conqueror and administrator. The activities and games of his childhood were probably designed to prepare him for his future royal duties. In addition, he was instructed in Writing (Lekha), Coinage (Rupa), Accountancy (Ganana), Law (Vyavahara), and administrative procedures (Vidhi), which made him skilled in matters of statecraft. The study of Lekha in his education went beyond simple writing and included the practice of royal correspondence and official administration.

== Expeditions of Western India ==
=== Encounter with Satkarani I ===
Kharavela in the second reginal year dispatched a large army of elephantry, cavalry, infantry and chariots towards the western regions without even caring for Satakarni, who apparently ruled the country to the west of Kalinga. In the course of this expedition, the Kalinga armies are further said to have reached the banks of the Krishnabena river (Krishna) where the city called Asikanagara was threatened.

=== Conquest of Vidyadhara region ===
Kharavela in the 4th reginal year invaded the invincible Vidyadhara territory that had been the military recruiting ground of the former kings of Kalinga. Dr. B.M. Barua, thinks that the Vidyadharas were an aboriginal people noted for their magical skill and lived in Arkatpur (modern Arkad or Arcot in Madras Pradesh). In the Jaina literature, the Vidyadharas are known as a tribal people residing in the Vindhya mountains. NK Sahu identifies it with the eighteen forest kingdoms or Sarvatavika Rajya of the Allahabad Inscription of Samudragupta as well as the eighteen Vidyadhara settlements of the Jaina work.

=== Subjugation of Rathikas and Bhojakas ===
In the fourth year of his reign, an expedition was launched against the Bhojakas the ruling chiefs of Berar, and the Rathikas of the adjoining Marathi-speaking districts of East Khandesh and Ahmednagar, who were defeated and compelled to do homage. It may be pointed out that Maharathi-Tranakairo, who was the father-in-law of Satakarni I, was probably the Chief of the Rathikas and either he or his successor had to sustain the defeat. Prof EJ Rapson, on the other hand, held that the Rashtrikas belonged to the Maratha country and the Bhojakas to the Berar region, but both were feudatories of the Andhra kings of Pratishthana.

The geographical location of the Rathikas and Bhojakas, as well as, the relationship between the Satavahanas and the Rathikas clearly indicate that Kharavela war with the Rathikas and Bhojakas could not have been possible without an encounter against the Satavahana power. As a consequence of this victory, Kharavela's suzerainty could spread over the Deccan from sea to sea.

== Northern India Conquests ==
=== Siege of Rajagriha ===
In the eighth year of his reign Kharavela undertook his first expedition against the North.The strong fort of the Gorathagiri, one of the hill fortresses guarding Rajagrha, was demolished and the city was put into great trouble. His armies marched past the Barabar hills in the Gaya district, destroying its fortifications, and laid siege to the city of Rajagriha. The news of these exploits of Kharavela caused so much terror in the heart of a Yavana king Dimata, that he fled to Mathura. The yavanas were apparently, purged out of Mathura which was then a famous stronghold of Jainism. Kharavela diverted the plans to invade Magadha as immediate attention was required towards the North-west, as a result of which Magadha was spared that year

Kharavela caused so much terror in the heart of a Yavana king that he fled away to Mathura. The Yavana ruler, whose name is some-times doubtfully read as Dimita or Dimata (? Demetrius), was probably a later Indo-Greek ruler of the eastern Punjab.

=== Conquest of Magadha ===
Brihaspatimitra ruled over Anga, Magadha, Vatsa (Kausambi) and Panchala (Ahichhatra) regions. He seems to have been related to the Mitra kings of Magadha whose records and coins have been found in the Gaya District. To avenge the humiliation of Kalinga during the time of the Nandas and the Mauryas, Kharavela carried away much booty from Anga and Magadha together with certain Jain images originally taken away by a Nanda king from Kalinga.

== Southern India Conquests ==
After returning from the North, Kharavela faced a formidable challenge from the confederated Tamil States of the South. This alliance comprised the states of the Cholas, Pandyas, Satyaputras, Keralaputras, and the island of Ceylon Tamraparni), which, according to inscriptions, had existed for 130 years prior to Kharavela's time. Historical records and the Edicts of Ashoka indicate that these territories were never subdued by Mahapadmananda or Chandragupta Maurya and remained independent southern neighbors of the Maurya Empire.

The Hathigumpha Inscription claims that Kharavela had ploughed down with a plough of asses of the city of Pithuihda, founded by a former king (puram rajanivesitath Plthuiham). Pithumda is taken to be the same as Ptolemy’s Pitundra, the metropolis, in the land of the Maisoloi in the upper part of the Coromandel coast. The Pandya king, apparently the league's leader, surrendered and was compelled to offer large quantities of pearls, jewels, and precious stones to Kalinganagara as tribute.

== Religion ==
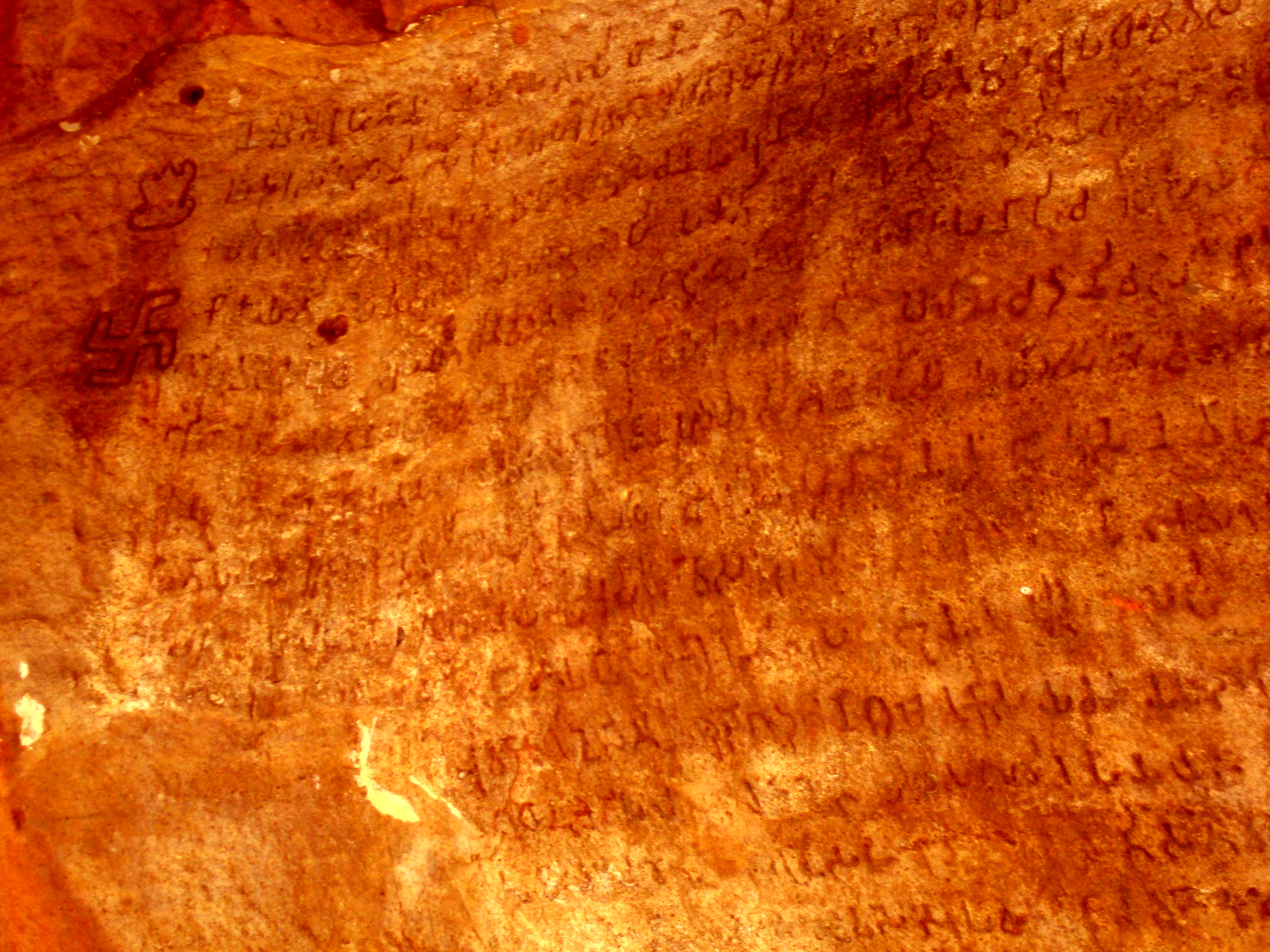
Namokar Mantra Inscribed at Hathigumpha Inscription by Kharavela c. 20 BCE.

Kharavela is generally called a Jain king. His Hathigumpha inscription begins with a variation of the salute to arihants and siddhas. This is similar to the Jain Pancha-Namaskara Mantra, in which three more entities are invoked in addition to the arihants and siddhas. Other parts of the Hathigumpha inscription, as well as the minor inscriptions found at Udayagiri from around 1st-century BCE use Jain phrases. The inscription also states that he brought back a Jina idol from Magadha, which had been taken by a Nanda king.

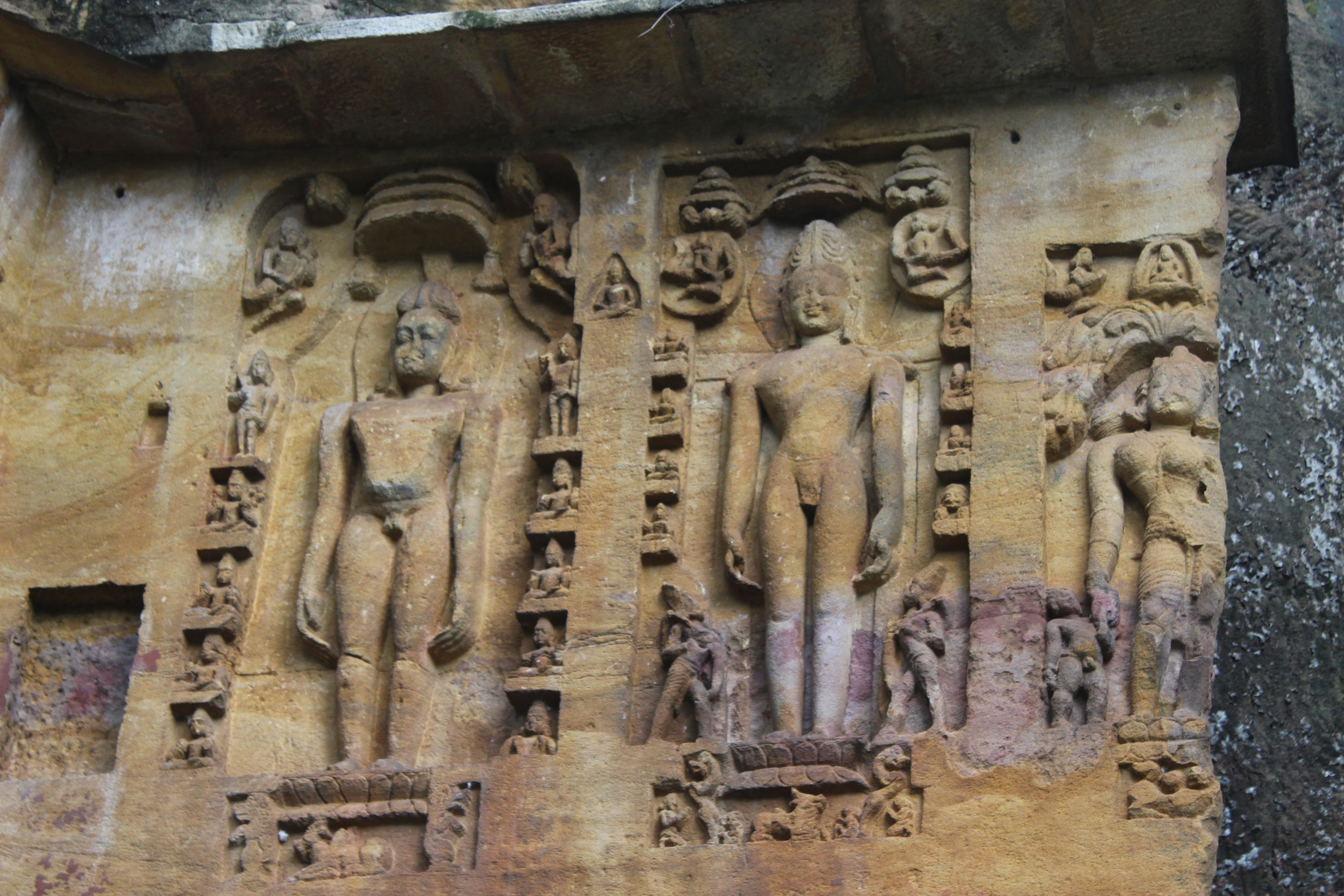
Carvings of Rishabhanatha with long locks of hair and symbol of bull, yakshi ambika from Ambika Gumpha, Khandagiri hill. 11th century CE

Kharavela seems to have been religiously liberal: his inscription describes him as someone who worshipped all gods and repaired temples of all deities. According to Paul Dundas, such claims, also made by Ashoka, were intended to portray the king as a universal ruler. Jain author Hampa Nagarajaiah sees Kharavela's liberalism as an example of the Jain doctrine of Anekantamata. According to Helmuth von Glasenapp, Kharavela was probably a free-thinker who patronized all his subjects including Jains.

== Biography ==
According to the Hathigumpha inscription, Kharavela spent his first 24 years on education and sports, a period when he mastered the fields of writing, coinage, accounting, administration and procedures of law. He was the prince to the throne (yuvaraja) at 16, and crowned King of Kalinga at age 24. The Hathigumpha inscription details his first 13 years of his reign. Some notable aspects of this reign includes:

Year 1
Many public infrastructure projects: Kharavela repaired gates and buildings that had been damaged by storms, built reservoirs and tanks, and restored the gardens.
Year 2
Dispatch of an army with cavalry, elephants, chariots, and men towards a kingdom led by "Satakani" or "Satakamini" (identified with Satakarni, near Krishna river valley). It also mentions Kharavela's threat to a city variously interpreted as "Masika" (Masikanagara), "Musika" (Musikanagara), "Asika" (Asikanagara, capital of Assaka). Scholars interpret the events described in the inscription differently. Jayaswal, Banerji and Sen say that Kharavela threatened Satakarni. According to Bhagwal Lal, King Satakarni of the western region wanted to avoid an invasion of his kingdom by Kharavela and sent him horses, elephants, chariots and men in tribute. That year, Kharavela captured the city of Masika with the aid of the Kusumba Kshatriyas. According to Alain Daniélou, Kharavela was friendly with Satakarni. Sudhakar Chattopadhyaya writes that Kharavela's army failed to advance against Satakarni and diverged to threaten the city of Asika (Asikanagara).
Year 3
Well-versed in Gandharvan music, Kharavela entertained the city with festive gatherings which included singing, dancing and instrumental music.
Year 4
Rathikas and Bhojakas bow to him, he built monuments to Vidyadharas
Year 5
Kharavela commissioned extended a canal originally built by the Nandas ti-vasa-sata ago, thus brought it into the capital of Kalinga. Ti-vasa-sata can mean 103 or 300 years. Most scholars, such as Barua and Sircar interpret this to be 300 years. This implies that Kharavela came to power about 300 years when this region was under the Nanda dynasty rule.
Years 6–7
His wife, who is stated to be from Vajiragraha family, gives birth to their child. Kharavela exempts taxes and performs charitable works that help hundreds of thousands of people. According to K. P. Jayaswal and R. D. Banerji, the king also performed the Rajasuya sacrifice – a Vedic ritual for the king, then gives gifts to Jain monks and Brahmins. According to Sircar, this ink impression and reading is doubtful. Similarly the alleged achievements of Kharavela here are problematic and doubtful Sircar also adds that this should not be read as "sacrifice ritual", but a different similar word with the meaning "royal fortune" he used to give away gifts.
Years 8–9
The record is partially damaged. It mentions a Yavana king running away in fear and retreating to Mathura. Alain Daniélou writes that Kharavela sacked Gorathagiri (near the Barabar Hills) with a large army and subdued the town of Rajagriha (identified with present-day Rajgir). According to Ananta Prasad Banerji-Sastri, Kharavela expelled members of the Ajivika sect (a rival of the Jains) from the Barabari caves and mutilated their inscriptions.
Year 10
Much of the record is lost. The inscription mentions Bharatavasa and a series of military campaigns with victories. Kharavela defeats the Ava king and broke up the 113-year confederacy of the "T[r]amira" countries which had endangered Kalinga. Sen and Alain Daniélou interpret "Tramira" as "Dramira" ("Dravidian") confederacy.
Year 12
Parts of this record are lost. Kharavela sends his troops to Uttarpatha (the north), and subdues the king of Magadha. K. P. Jayaswal identified Bahasmita with Pushyamitra Shunga, but Hem Chandra Raychaudhuri discredits this theory. Sudhakar Chattopadhyaya believes that Bahasatimita may have been a king of Kaushambi, and his rule might have extended to Magadha as well. This section of the inscription mentions a "Ka[li]ngajinam" taken by Nanda king in the past and he brought it back to Kalinga. Kharavela built a settlement of a hundred masons with a tax exemption.
Year 13
This is the last part of the inscription and praises Kharavela. It also states that he organized a council of ascetics and sages, and constructed a shelter, commissioned the compilation of the text of the seven-fold Angas in the sixty-four letters (scripts). The inscription also claims that Kharavela was a descendant of the royal sage Vasu.

=== Succession ===
Kulke and Rothermund state Kharavela's empire state that the history of ancient India is unclear including the times after Ashoka and Kharavela. Given the lack of major inscriptions by his successors, they surmise that the Kharavela empire likely disintegrated soon after his death. A little is known about the next two generations of kings - Vakradeva (a.k.a. Kudepasiri or Vakadepa) and Vadukha - but through the minor inscriptions at Udayagiri. Kharavela was succeeded by Sada dynasty kings. Siri Sada is mentioned as a Mahameghavahana king in an inscription at Guntupalli.

== Personality ==
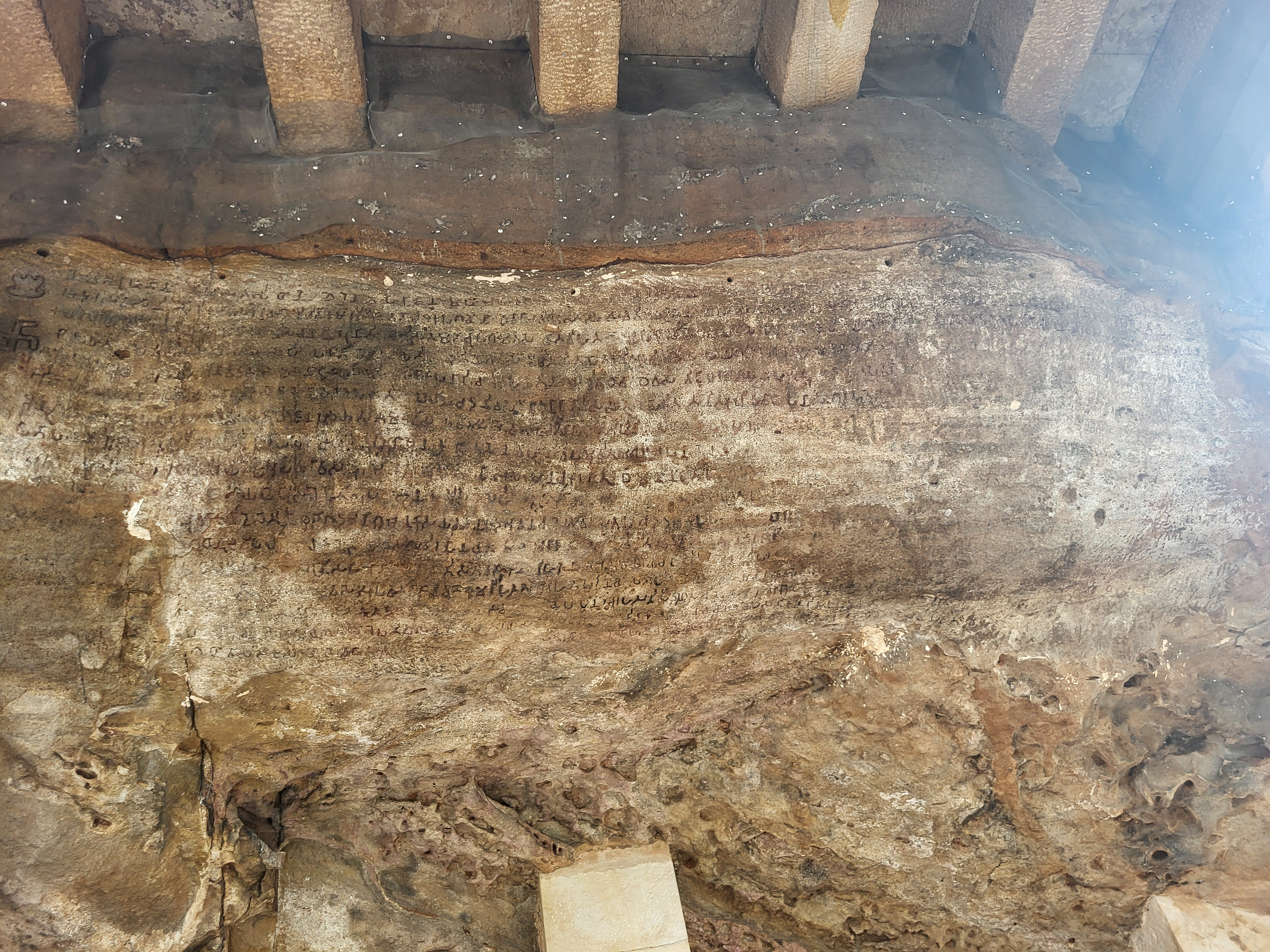
Hathigumpha inscription of Kharavela.

Kharavela's inscription depict him as a man with ruddy and handsome body and had lived a youthful life for 25 years, a keen learner having who received a thorough education and had mastered writing, coinage, accountancy, administration and legal procedures. He is one of the very few early Indian monarchs who proudly proclaim to have been systematically educated in their official inscription. The Hathigumpha inscription had portrayed him as a compassionate ruler who made a settlement of a hundred and thousands of masons, giving them exemption from land revenue. It also mentions that he donated royal maintenances, China clothes (silks) and white clothes to the Jain monks and made temples and caves for arahats and sramanas.

The inscription states that Kharavela was a great patron of art and music and well versed in the science of Gandharvas. He held festivities and assemblies and entertains his capital with exhibition of dapa, dancing, singing and instrumental music.

The inscription praises Kharavela's might and his patronage to all temples, stating that he repaired all the temples and whose chariot and army are irresistible.

== Legacy ==
Kharavela's inscriptions call him a Kalinga-Chakravartin (Emperor of Kalinga). He was one of Kalinga's strongest rulers. The inscription states that after his imperial coronation he repaired the gates, walls and forts of the capital city which had been damaged by storm.

=== Date ===
The kingdom of Kalinga was invaded by Ashoka c. 262-261 BCE. The Hathigumpha inscription implies that Kalinga regained its independence from the Maurya Empire sometime after Ashoka's death, and Kharavela was born in an independent Kalinga.

In 1885, the colonial era epigraphist Bhagwan Lal Indraji read the 16th line of the Hathigumpha inscription as a reference to Maurya kala and 165th year after this new timeline, which he called the Mauryan era. Indraji concluded that Kharavela was born in 127 BCE and became king in 103 BCE. Indraji's interpretations were questioned by scholars and has been largely rejected.

According to Sudhakar Chattopadhyaya, the 16th line does not mention Maurya kala ("Maurya era") but reads Mukhya kala ("the main era"). Chattopadhyaya relies on the description of Kharavela's fifth regnal year in the Hathigumpha inscription, which he says implies that Kharavela flourished ti-vasa-sata years after the Nandaraja. Hem Chandra Raychaudhuri identifies Nandaraja with Mahapadma Nanda or one of his sons. The expression ti-vasa-sata can mean 103 or 300 years; Chattopadhyaya does not consider 103 plausible, since it would contradict Ashoka's records. Based on this, he places Kharavela in the second half of the first century BCE or the first half of the first century CE.

Depending on the variant readings, different dates continue to be published in post-colonial era texts. Alain Daniélou, for example, places Kharavela between 180 BCE and 130 BCE, identifying him as a contemporary of Satakarni and Pushyamitra Shunga. According to Rama Shankar Tripathi, Kharavela reigned during the third quarter of the first century BCE. Many other scholars, such as D.C. Sircar and Walter Spink, date Kharavela and the Hathigumpha inscription in the 1st-century BCE to early 1st-century CE.

== See also ==
- Hathigumpha inscription
- Kharavela's Invasion of Vidharbha
