= Aniruddha (Buddhist) =

Disciple of Śākyamuni Buddha, foremost in the divine eye

Most Venerable Anuruddha Maha Thera
- Title: Dibbacakkhukānan (Of those endowed with the ability of clairvoyance)

Personal life
- Born: Aniruddha Kapilavatthu
- Died: (aged 150) Veluva village, Vajjika League
- Parent: Sakya King Amitodana (father)
- Occupation: bhikkhu

Religious life
- Religion: Buddhism
- Dharma name: Aniruddha

Senior posting
- Teacher: Gautama Buddha
- Students: Most ven. Mahā Sumana Maha Thera, etc.

Anuruddha (Sanskrit: अनुरुद्ध; Pali: Anuruddha), also spelled Aniruddha, was one of the ten principal disciples and a cousin of The Buddha.

== Early years ==
Anuruddha was the son of Amitodana and brother to Mahānāma and princess Rohiṇī. Since Amitodana was the brother of Suddhodana, king of the Sakyas in Kapilavatthu, Anuruddha was cousin to Siddhattha, the future Buddha. He was a kshatriya by birth, enabling him to be raised in wealth. The Buddha returned to his home town two years after his enlightenment, preaching his ideas to the Sakyan kingdom. Together with his 3 cousins Bhaddiya, Ānanda, and Devadatta and their servant Upāli, Anuruddha became ordained by the Buddha at the Anupiya Mango Grove.

== Religious life ==
Anuruddha acquired "divine vision" (divyacakṣur) and was ranked foremost among those who had the ability. Sariputta assigned the eight thoughts of a great man for Anuruddha to use as a meditation topic. Journeying into the Pacinavamsadaya in the Ceti country to practice, he was able to master seven, but could not learn the eighth, which Buddha taught him. Anuruddha developed insight and then realized arahantship.

== Depiction ==
Anuruddha is depicted in the Pāli canon as an affectionate and loyal bhikkhu, and stood near the Buddha in assembly. At one point, when the Buddha was disappointed with the arguments of the monks at Kosambi, he retreated to Pacinavamsadaya to stay with Anuruddha. In many texts, even when many distinguished monks were present, Anuruddha is often the recipient of the Buddha's questions, and answers on behalf of the Saṅgha.

== After the Buddha ==
Anuruddha was present when the Buddha died at Kusinara. He was foremost in consoling the monks and in admonishing them on their future course of action, reminding them of the Buddha's decree to follow the Dhamma. As the Buddha was reclining and going through the jhānas, Ānanda said to Anuruddha: "The Exalted One has attained final Nibbana, Venerable Sir." Anuruddha, having divine vision, stated that the Buddha was absorbed in the state of "cessation," but had not yet died. Anuruddha was consulted by the Mallas of Kusinara regarding the Buddha's last obsequies.

Later, at the First Buddhist Council, he played a notable role and was entrusted with the custody of the Aṅguttara Nikāya. Anuruddha died at Veluvagama in the Vajjika League in the shade of a bamboo thicket. He was one hundred and fifty years old at the time of his death.

== Depictions in the Jātaka ==
Anuruddha is frequently depicted in the Jātaka, which describes the previous reincarnations of Buddhist figures. In the time of Padumuttara Buddha, he had been a wealthy householder. Hearing one of the monks declared best among possessors of the celestial eye, he desired a similar honor. He performed acts of merit, including holding a great feast of light in front of the Buddha's tomb. In Kassapa Buddha's era he had reincarnated and was born in Varanasi; one day he placed bowls filled with ghee around the Buddha's tomb and set them alight, circumscribed the tomb throughout the night, bearing on his head a lighted bowl.

He was then reborn in an impoverished family in Varanasi and was named Annabhāra. One day, while working for his master, the banker Sumana, he gave his meal to a paccekabuddha, Upariṭṭha. The banker, having heard of Annabhāra's pious deed, rewarded him by helping to establish a business for him. The king, impressed, gave him a site for a house, and when the ground beneath was excavated, yielded much buried treasure.
