= Brihaspatimitra =

Brihaspatimitra (Bṛihaspatimitra), also known as Bahasatimita and Bahasatimitra, was a king of Kosambi in India. He was part of the Mitra dynasty of Kosambi. His reign is estimated to be around mid 1st century BCE.

== Name ==
Many of the rulers of Mitra dynasty bear the suffix "-mitra" in their names.

== Extent of rule ==
Brhaspatimitra has been called Magadharaja, a king of Magadha, in Kharavela's Hathigumpha inscription (that is related to Hathigumpha inscription). If the Brhaspatimitra mentioned in the inscription is the same king as the Brhaspatimitra of Mitra dynasty, then that would mean that the dynasty held a considerable influence in the region surrounding Kosambi. It is worth to note that there is numismatic evidence to support this theory, as Magadha is not known to not have produced any typical regional coinage unlike the contemporary Kosambi, Mathura or Panchala.

== Coins of Brihaspatimitra ==
Most rulers of the Mitra dynasty of Kosambi, except Radhamitra, have the symbol known as the tree-in-railing in their coins. Another common symbol is the Ujjain symbol. Bull is a common animal to appear on the coinage of Kosambi of the era.
