= Sarpamitra =

Sarpamitra (also known as Sapamita) was a king of Kosambi in India. He was part of the Mitra dynasty of Kosambi.

He may have ruled somewhere around the 1st century BCE or the 1st century CE.

== Name ==
Many of the rulers of the Mitra dynasty bear the suffix "-mitra" in their names. The first part of his name, Sarpa-, while rare is synonymous with Naga. Naga is a more common part in the names of monarchs in Northern and Southern India.

== Coins of Sarpamitra ==
Most rulers of the Mitra dynasty of Kosambi, except Radhamitra, have the symbol known as the tree-in-railing in their coins. Another common symbol is the Ujjain symbol. Bull is a common animal to appear on the coinage of Kosambi of the era.
