= Mitra dynasty (Kosambi) =

Historical ruling family in India

Approximate location of the Mitra dynasty, in the 1st century CE.

Mitra dynasty of Kosambi was centered on the city of Kosambi at the Vatsa region. Its capital Kosambi was among the most important trade centers in the ancient India. The dynasty also likely controlled territory in nearby regions such as Magadha.

Many of its rulers bear the suffix "-mitra" in their names. However, it is disputed how many kings the dynasty was composed of. Dhanabhuti, who is known for Bharhut inscriptions, may have been related to the Mitra dynasty. A number of different, and possibly, related Mitra dynasties existed in the northern India, and it is possible that they all can trace their lineage back into the royal house of the Shunga Empire.

Common symbols in the coinage of the Mitra dynasty include the tree-in-railing and the Ujjain symbol. Bull is a common animal to appear on the coinage.

The Mitra dynasty was ended when Samudragupta of the Gupta Empire annexed Kosambi in the middle of the 4th century CE.

== Possible origins ==
The Vatsa region and its capital Kosambi was among the most important trade centres in ancient India. After the Mauryas and Shungas lost control of the area, Kosambi established itself as a solid independent civic centre. A large number of coins from Kosambi is known. The initial coinage was based on locally modified variants of the Mauryan-Shunga style cast copper coins, and a few of the coins were inscribed with the city's name. Later coinage evolved to portray a more independent iconography, and they began to be inscribed with the names of rulers. This is an indication that the city's local government transitioned into a monarchy. The bull was a common symbol when the coinage minted by the city evolved to have a more robust local character.

It is likely that the Mitra dynasty started its independent rule in Vatsa after the Maurya Empire, or the collapse of the Shunga Empire, allowed various petty states to emerge in the Northern India.

There were possibly five different contemporary dynasties identifiable with the suffix "-mitra". These various Mitra dynasties may have shared a link with the Shunga dynasty, as many of its rulers' names also ended with "-mitra". It is possible that the Shungas may have used a similar method of governing provinces as the preceding Maurya Empire had done. Princes with royal blood would have been sent to govern the provinces, and after the central power had weakened they would have established their own dynasties. Some numismatic evidence for the possible connection between Mitras and the Shunga dynasty descending from Pushyamitra has been found.

There were, possibly linked, Mitra dynasties ruling in Panchala, Mathura, Ayodhya and also possibly at Magadha.

== Expansion ==
During the time period stretching from the 1st century BCE to the 2nd century CE, the Mitras of Kosambi appear to have extended their hegemony over Magadha (including Pataliputra), and possibly Kannauj as well. Inscriptions and coins of the Mitra dynasty are known from various parts of Bihar.

Brhaspatimitra has been called Magadharaja, a king of Magadha, in Kharavela's Hathigumpha inscription (that is related to Hathigumpha inscription). If the Brhaspatimitra mentioned in the inscription is the same king as the Brhaspatimitra of Mitra dynasty, then that would mean that the dynasty held a considerable influence in the region surrounding Kosambi. It is worth to note that there is numismatic evidence to support this theory, as Magadha is not known to not have produced any typical regional coinage unlike the contemporary Kosambi, Mathura or Panchala.

== Conquest by the Gupta Empire ==
Possible extent of the Gupta Empire near the end of Samudragupta's reign. Prayaga, on the map, is an alternate name for the city of Kosambi.

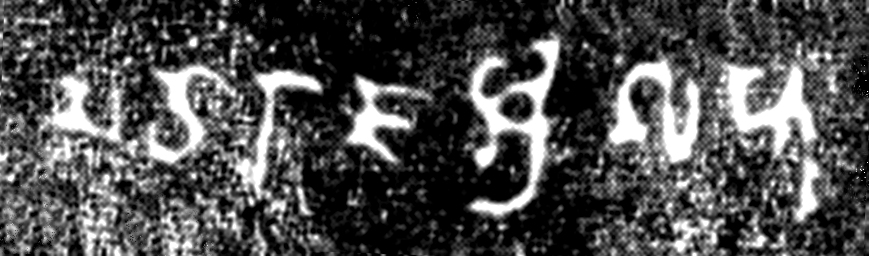
Gupta script inscription "Maharaja Sri Gupta" (Great King, Lord Gupta"), mentioning the first ruler of the dynasty king Gupta. Inscription by Samudragupta on the Allahabad pillar, where Samudragupta presents king Gupta as his great-grandfather. Dated circa 350 CE.

Samudragupta (r. c. 335–375 CE) of the Gupta Empire appears to have ended the Mitra dynasty of Kosambi during his conquests in the middle of the 4th century CE. While the pillar was originally erected by Ashoka, Samudragupta later added his own inscription on the same pillar. Harisena, a poet and a high-ranking military commander in Samudragupta's army, was the author of the inscriptions.

According to the theory proposed by 19th-century archaeologists, and supported by Indian scholars such as Upinder Singh, the Allahabad pillar came from somewhere else, probably Kosambi. The Edicts of Ashoka suggest that the pillar was first erected at Kosambi, some 50 kilometers west of its current location. It was moved to Allahabad much later when the region came under Muslim rule. The presence of another broken pillar at Kosambi near the ruins of the Ghoshitarama monastery has led some to believe that the Allahabad pillar might have been one of a pair, not unlike the ones discovered at Rampurva.

== List of kings ==
Name	Native (Prakrit) name	Sanskrit form (if relevant)	Notes
Agaraju	Agarāju	N/A	Possibly one of the earlier kings in the dynasty
Agnimitra	Agimita	Agnimitra	Succeeded by his sons Jyesthamitra and Vasumitra (Sumitra)
Asvaghosa	Aśvaghoṣa	N/A	
Brhaspatimitra	Bahasatimita	Bṛhaspatimitra / Bahasatimitra	Possibly held the title Magadharaja, a king of Magadha
Devamitra	(Devamita?)	Devamitra	Disputed: K.D. Bajpai assigns him to the Mitra dynasty of Ayodhya
Jyesthamitra	Jeṣamita	Jyeṣṭhamitra	Succeeded his father Agnimitra. Ruled between c. 140–133 BCE. His brother Vasumitra (Sumitra) rose to the throne after him.
Prajapatimitra	Pajāpatimita	Prajāpatimitra	
Prausthamitra	Pothamita	Prauṣṭhamitra	
Radhamitra	Rādhāmita	Rādhāmitra	Known for his unusual hexagonal coins, and possibly one of the earliest kings in the dynasty
Sarpamitra	Sapamita	Sarpamitra	He may have ruled somewhere around the 1st century BCE or the 1st century CE.

=== Disputed kings ===
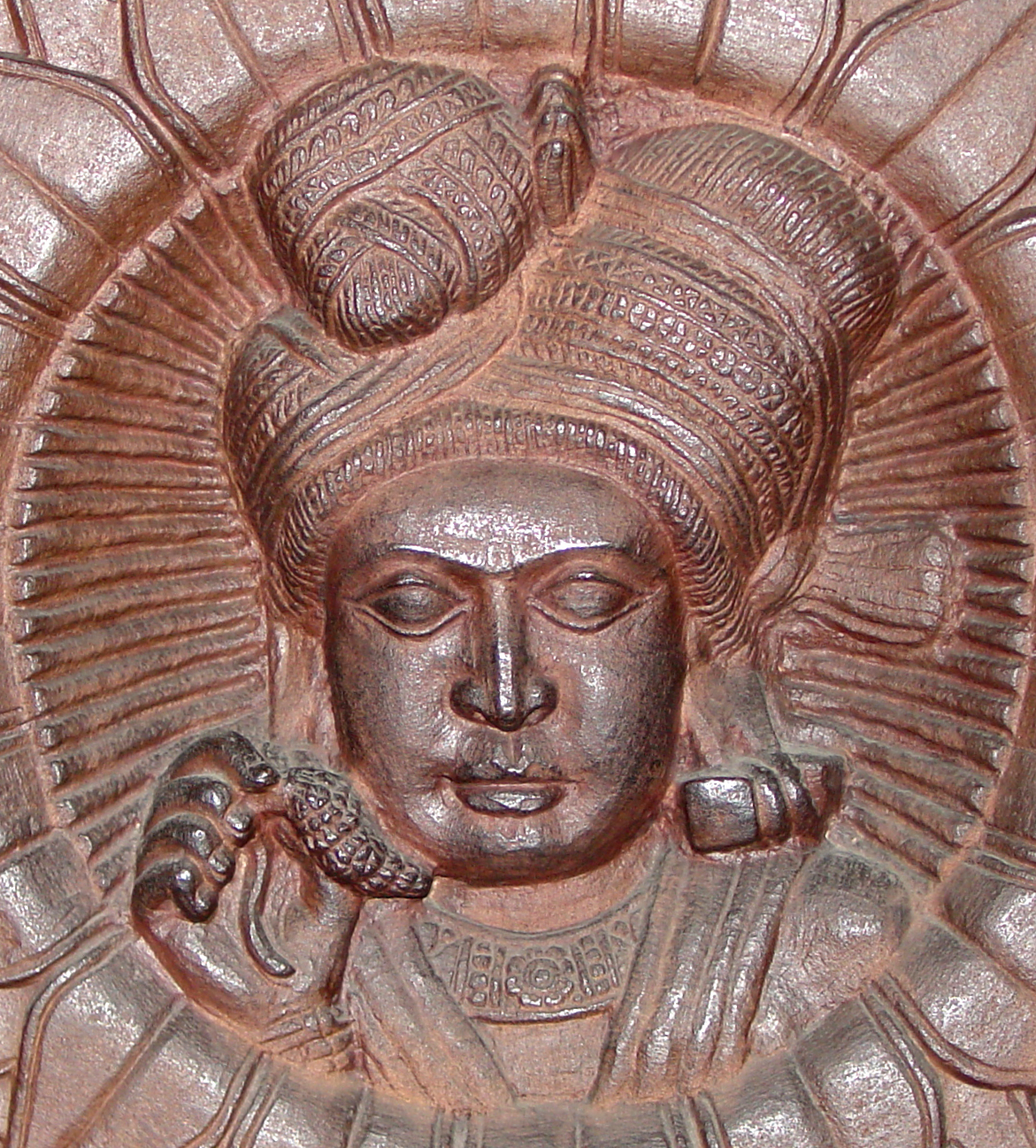
Portrait of Dhanabhuti

The exact number of kings in the dynasty has been disputed to be between seven and twenty-five different kings.

Another opinion is that some of the Mitras of Kannauj actually belonged to the house of Kosambi, and that there were actually no long-lived separate Mitra dynasty at Magadha. K. D. Bajpai holds that the first Mitra ruler of Kosambi was Sungavarma (Sugavamasa). Sungavarma's name includes the epithet Sunga, and that makes it possible to link him with the ruling dynasty of the Shunga Empire. Furthermore, Bajpai argues that Angaraja, Dhanabhuti and Visvadeva were also part of the Mitras of Kosambi. Their names appear in the Bharhut inscriptions. They would be probable descendants of king Sungavarma. The kings of Kosambi lent their patronage for the stupa of Bharhut, which would have been within the territory they controlled.

A genealogy constructed from the Bharhut inscriptions would link the above-mentioned kings to the Mitra dynasty so that Visvadeva would be father of Agaraju. Dhanabhuti would be Agaraju's son.

== Coins of Mitra dynasty ==
Most rulers of the Mitra dynasty of Kosambi, except Radhamitra, have the symbol known as the tree-in-railing in their coins. Another common symbol is the Ujjain symbol. Bull is a common animal to appear on the coinage of Kosambi of the era.

Some of the coins of Radhamitra are known for their unusual hexagonal shape. They were manufactured by casting, but they were made to closely resemble punch-marked coins. The civic coinage of Vatsa is known for their wide innovation in shapes of coins.

The symbols in one of Radhamitra's series of coins make a clear connection with other rulers of Kosambi such as Asvaghosa, Brhaspatimitra, Agnimitra, Sarpamitra, Prajapatimitra, Jyesthamitra and Prausthamitra. The coins cast by these rulers portray similar symbols in obverse and reverse sides of their coins. However, the exact chronology of these coins has not been extensively and conclusively studied yet. The civic coinage has been thought to precede the nominative coinage of the kings.

== See also ==
- Udayana (king)
