= Kodavatiganti Kutumbarao =

Indian writer

- Born: Kutumba Rao; October 28, 1909; Tenali, Guntur district, Andhra Pradesh, India
- Died: August 17, 1980 (aged 70); Madras, Tamilnadu
- Education: Bachelor of Science
- Alma mater: Maharajah College, Vizianagaram
- Occupation: Journalism
- Spouse(s): Padmavathy, Sundaramma & Varudhini
- Children: Ramachandra Rao, Santa Sundari, Rohini Prasad, Venkatarama Rao
- Relatives: Siblings – Venkatasubbaiah, Krishnamurty, Annapurna.
- Writing career
- Pen name: Wrote Political essays under pseudonyms, Äswini"& "Brihaspati"
- Period: 1926–1928
- Genres: Writer, novelist, author & journalist
- Subjects: Sociology, Music, Science, Politics, Cinema & a couple of scripts for films.
- Notable works: "Chaduvu", Vaarasatvam"", "Gaddu Rozulu" & Editor of the most popular Telugu monthly for children-the "Chandamama"for 28 years
- Notable awards: Andhra Sahitya Academy Award,
- Literary movement: Active part in "Virasama"( Viplava Rachayitula Sangham" )- revolutionary writers association.
- Website: kodavatiganti.iwarp.com

Kodavatiganti Kutumba Rao (28 October 1909 – 17 August 1980), also known as Ko Ku, was an exponent of the Telugu literature in the 20th century. He believed that literature which criticises and enriches human life and ultimately reforms the human thought of its time is the only relevant form of literature.

== Life ==
Kodavatiganti Kutumbarao was born in to a middle-class family in Tenali, Guntur district. His schooling until 1925 was in Tenali. He lost his father in 1914 and his mother in 1920, and grew up with his uncle. He was very familiar with village life.

His elder brother Venkatasubbiah (out of touch since 1921) was a poet-writer and he was introduced to the literary community early through him. He was introduced to western literature too during this time. His early experiments, at the age of thirteen, included an unfinished thriller and poetry, which he would soon abandon. He married eleven-year-old Padmavati in 1924, before he graduated from high school.

After Intermediate education (1925 to 1927) at A C college, Guntur, he studied for Bachelors Physics at Vijayanagaram Maharajah college. He started his serious attempts in writing during this time. Towards the end of his undergraduate education, he also became an atheist. He went to the Benaras Hindu University for his Masters in Physics. During this time, he published his first works: an essay called Cinema (1930) in the oriental weekly and Pranadhikam (1931), which won him the first prize in Gruhalakshmi. His masters was cut short in the second year due to the economic depression.

Later, he worked in several places from Shimla to Bombay to Madras, in such positions as a clerk, teacher, factory foreman and a film writer (including music direction for a film), before settling down in the field of journalism. After a stint in some papers, a few of which he founded himself, he was with Chandamama, a popular children's magazine, as its editor in 1952 until he died in 1980.

The era when he was born and grown was the time when there were reforms in Telugu society and also in India. His elder brother Kodavatiganti Venkatasubbaya was also a great essayist, and was also a member of 'Sahiti Samiti' because of which he was familiar with literature.

== Works ==
=== Novels ===
- Varasatvam
- Chaduvu
- Aishwaryam
- Endamavulu
- Arunodayam
- Jeevitam
- Gaddu Rojulu
- Anubhavam
- Savati Talli
- Panchakalyani
- Anamika
- Aadajanma
- Neekem kavali
- Preminchina Manishi
- Kuroopi
- Bedirina Manushulu
- Bratuku Bhayam
- Bakasura
- Sahasam
- Graha Shakalm
- Chaduvu
- Kulam Leni Manishi
- Saritadevi Diary
- Saroja Diary
- Kotta Alludu
- Kotta Kodalu
- Maaru Perlu
- Taara
- Timingalam Veta
- Maarina Jeevitam

=== Short stories ===
Ampakalu

- Kotta Paddhatulu
- Peeda Katha
- Niridyogam
- Adde kompa
- Daivaadinapu Jeevitam
- Kalisi Ravali
- Attadugu
- Sadyogam
- Nuvvulu – Telakapindi
- Ashta Kashtaalu
- Udyogam
- Nirudyogam
- Manamu memu
- Manushulaku Gala Swechchha
- Shavukaru Subbaiah
- Paiki vacchi
- Sheela Parisheelana
- Parishodhana Buddhi
- Bahukudu
- Panakam Lo Peechu
- Kotta Jeevitam
- Sri Krishna Parabrhmanenamaha
- Paapa Phalam
- Pudigundalu
- Piriki Dayyam
- Sadyogam
- Out
- Cinema Sarada
- "Aada Bratuke Madhuram"
- Tallileni pilla
- Adde Kompa
- Nijamaina Apachaaram
- Mitra Droham
- 'Nee Kaalu Mokkutaa! Nee Baanchanni!
- Chedina Pelli
- Peddavaadi Praapakam

=== Nonfiction ===
- Cinema vyasaalu (Essays on Cinema)
- Science vyasaalu (Essays Science)
- Charitra vyasaalu (Essays on history)
- Samskruti vyasaalu (Cultural essays)
- Tatvika vyasaalu (Philosophical essays)
- Samajika vyasaalu (Social essays)

== Philosophy ==
Kodavatiganti Kutumbarao believed in the power of scientific method and materialism in solving the problems of humanity. The essence of his thought may be seen in a short story published in 1942 with the title, 'God and Satan'.

== Quotes ==
- The 'attempts' to save people from literature, literature from politics and politics from people amuse me much
- It is foolish to say that only the politicians, but not the artists, have the right to express themselves clear opinions on dictators, unemployment, lock-outs, wars, etc. Exploitation-mongers encourage such stupidity
- That which cannot reveal the secrets of nature is no science; that which cannot alleviate the drudgery of life is no 'invention'; that which cannot illuminate every nook and corner of life is no literature
- We need to create our literature for our own times ... Fixation to the literary standards of the bygone ages is nothing but deceit
