= Radhamitra =

Radhamitra (Rādhāmitra), or Radhamita, was a king of Kosambi, the capital of one of the previously independent Indian Mahajanapadas known before as Vatsa. He was part of the Mitra dynasty, and was likely one of the earliest kings in the dynasty.

It is likely that the Mitra dynasty started its independent rule in Vatsa after the Maurya Empire fragmented into many smaller states, or with the following weakening of the succeeding Shunga Empire.

Like with most other kings of the Mitra dynasty of Kosambi his name ends with mitra.

== Coins of Radhamitra ==
Some of the coins of Radhamitra are known for their unusual hexagonal shape. They were manufactured by casting, but they were made to closely resemble punch-marked coins. The civic coinage of Vatsa is known for their wide innovation in shapes of coins.

The symbols in one of his series of coins make a clear connection with other rulers of Kosambi such as Asvaghosa, Brhaspatimitra, Agnimitra, Sarpamitra, Prajapatimitra, Jyesthamitra and Prausthamitra. The coins cast by these rulers portray similar symbols in obverse and reverse sides of their coins. However, the exact chronology of these coins has not been extensively and conclusively studied yet. The civic coinage has been thought to precede the nominative coinage of the kings.

Coins of Radhamitra notably do not contain the symbol known as the tree-in-railing. All other rulers of Kosambi use the symbol in their coins.

== See also ==
- Udayana (king)
