= Dhanabhuti =

- Buddhist King
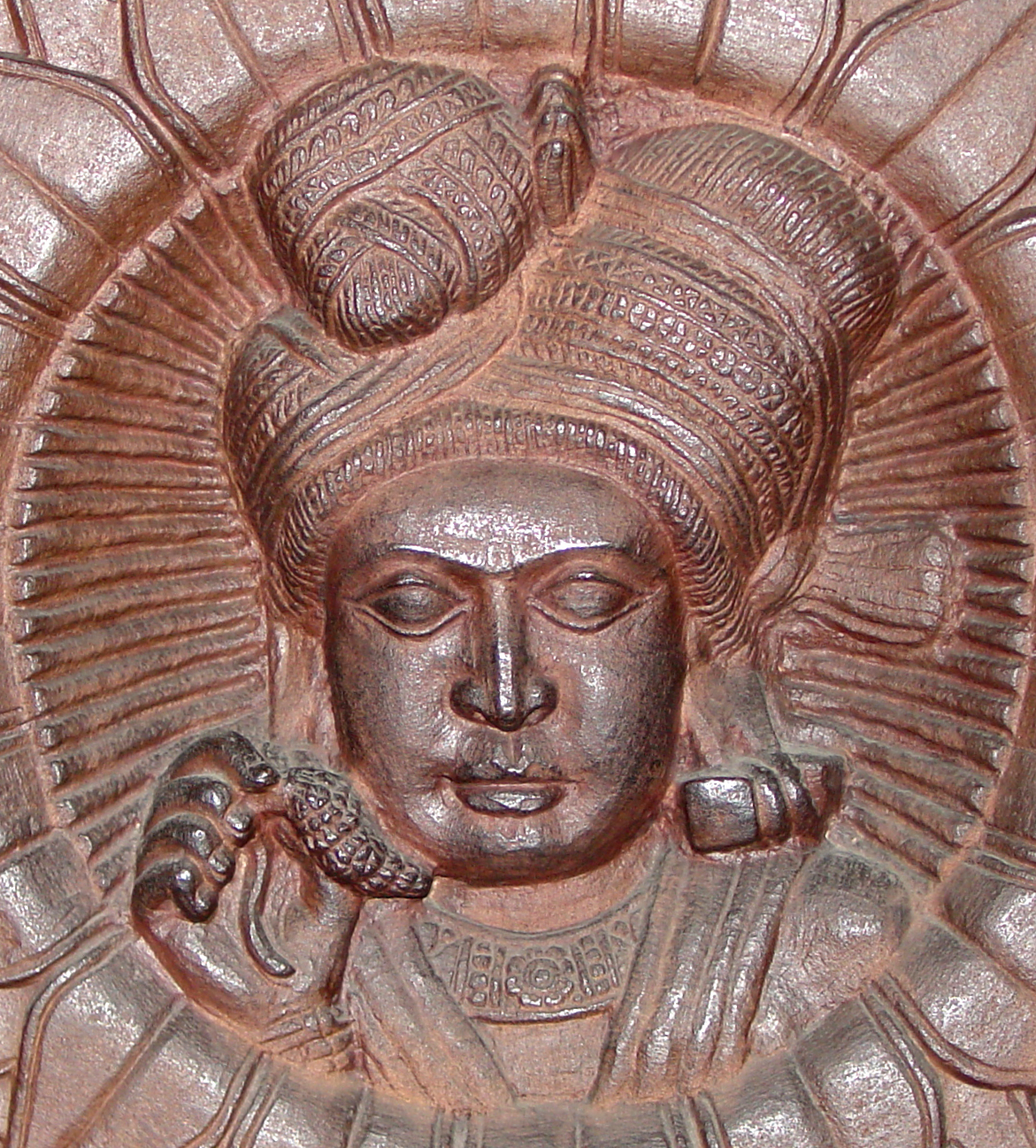
- Princely portrait from Bharhut
- Reign: Circa 150–75 BCE

Dhanabhuti is known through his inscriptions at Bharhut and Mathura. The main northern polities at that time were the Indo-Greeks and the Sungas.

Dhanabhūti (Brahmi: 𑀥𑀦𑀪𑀽𑀢𑀺) or Vatsiputra Dhanabhūti was a 2nd or 1st-century BCE Buddhist king in Central India, and the most prominent donor for the Bharhut stupa. He appears in two or three major dedicatory inscriptions at the stupa of Bharhut, and possibly in another inscription at Mathura. Dhanabhuti may have been a feudatory of the Sunga Empire, or a ruler in a neighbouring territory, such as Kosala or Panchala, or possibly a northern king from Sughana in Haryana. or he may have also been part of the Mitra dynasty of Kosambi.

== Bharhut inscriptions ==
Many portions of the stupa at Bharhut bear inscriptions with the names of Buddhist donors. Dhanabhuti is known from two, or possibly three, of these dedications, and he crucially dedicated the largest and most prestigious portion of the monument, the Eastern Gateway, now displayed in the Indian Museum, in Calcutta.

=== Eastern Gateway pillar ===
An epigraph on a pillar of the eastern gateway of the stupa of Bharhut mentions its erection "by Vatsiputra Dhanabhuti". The Bharhut eastern gateway is the only remaining of four original gateways. The flat linear style of sculptures at Bharhut is dated to circa 150 BCE, with the possibility that the more elaborate gateways were made slightly later in 100-75 BCE (most probably 75 BCE based on artistic analysis). The inscription is written in a classical form of the Brahmi script, highly similar with the script known from the time of Ashoka. The beginning of the inscription uses the expression "Suganam Raje", which is thought to mean "during the rule of the Sungas", although not without ambiguity.

In this inscription Dhanabhuti mentions that his grandfather was named "King Visvadeva", and his mother was named "Vāchhī".

Since Dhanabhuti was making a dedication to a Buddhist monument, and since the Sungas are known to have been Hindu monarchs, it seems that Dhanabhuti himself was not a member of the Sunga dynasty. His mention of "in the reign of the Sungas" also suggests that he was not himself a Sunga ruler.

The inscription, which can also be seen in a rubbing, reads:

Inscription of Dhanabhuti on the Eastern Gateway of Bharhut
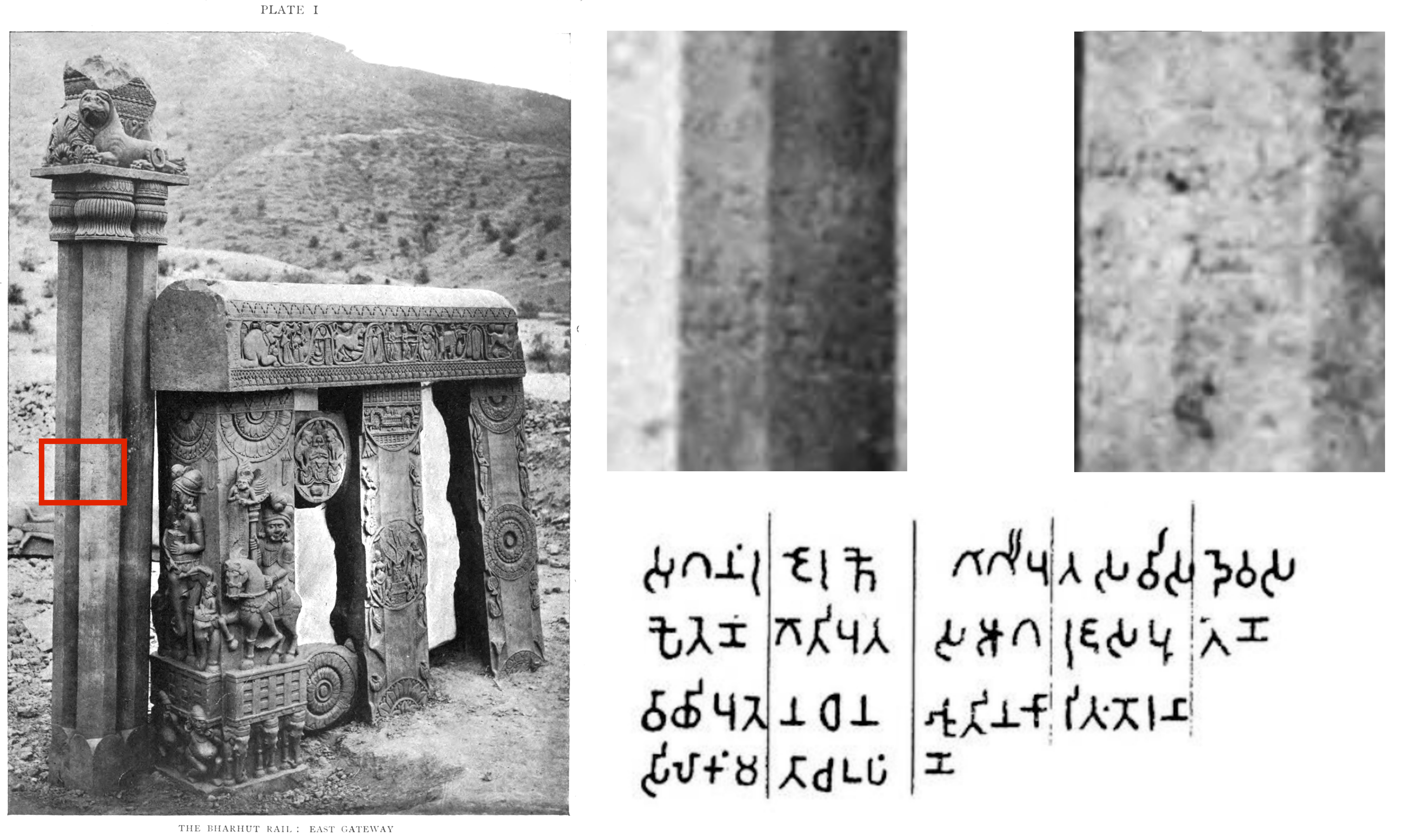
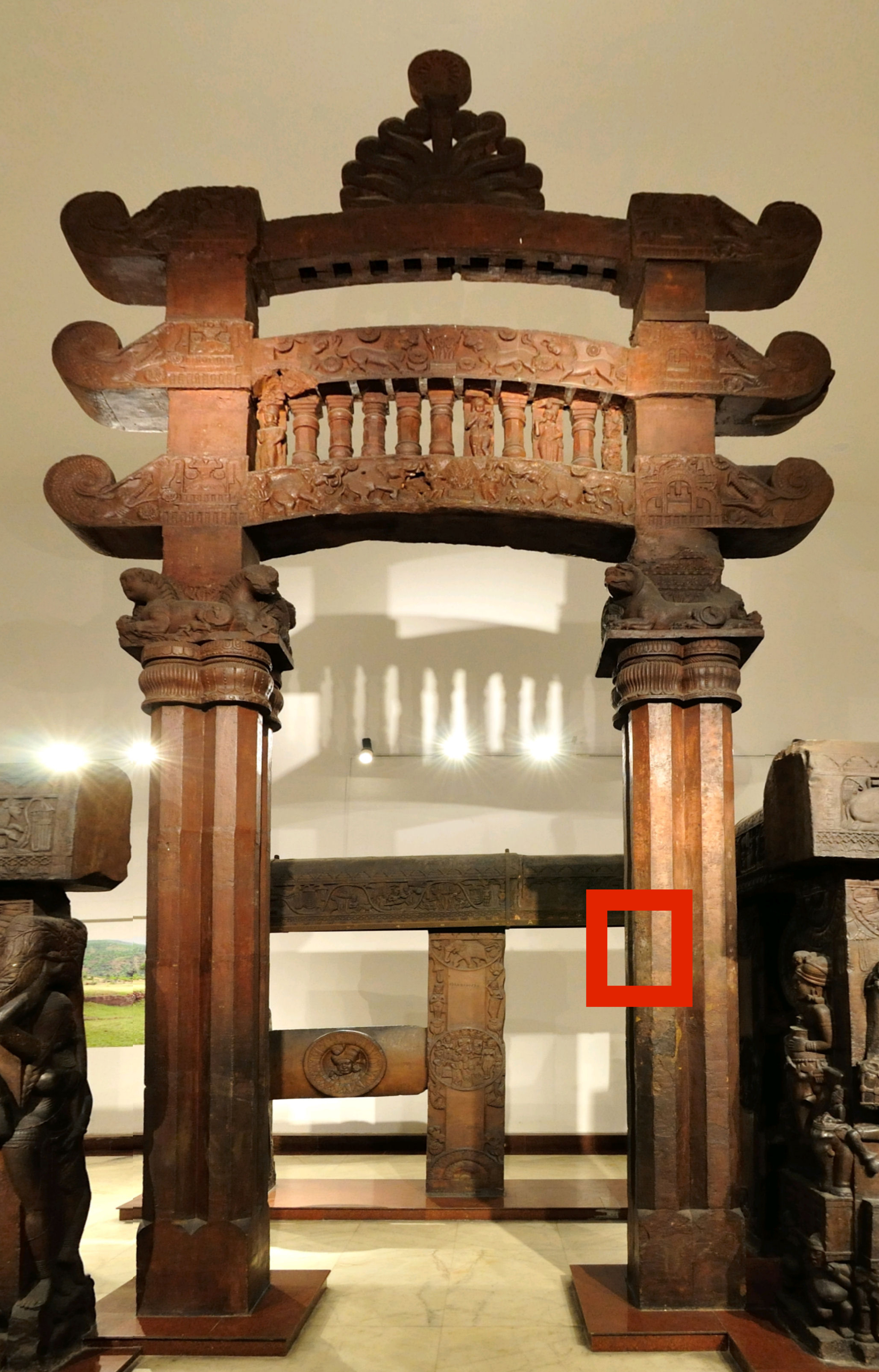
The Bharhut inscription where King Dhanabhuti is mentioned. The inscription is in the Brahmi script, and located on the inside of the eastern gateway, dated to 100-75 BCE. Now in the Indian Museum, Calcutta.

1. Suganam raje raño Gāgīputasa Visadevasa

𑀲𑀼𑀕𑀦𑀁 𑀭𑀚𑁂 𑀭𑀜𑁄 𑀕𑀸𑀕𑀻𑀧𑀼𑀢𑀲 𑀯𑀺𑀯𑀤𑁂𑀯𑀲
2. pautena, Gotiputasa Āgarajusa putena
𑀧𑁅𑀢𑁂𑀦 𑀕𑁄𑀢𑁂𑀧𑀼𑀢𑀲 𑀆𑀕𑀭𑀚𑀼𑀲 𑀧𑀼𑀢𑁂𑀦
3. Vāchhīputena Dhanabhūtina kāritam toranām
𑀯𑀸𑀙𑀻𑀧𑀼𑀢𑁂𑀦 𑀥𑀦𑀪𑀽𑀢𑀺𑀦 𑀓𑀸𑀭𑀺𑀢𑀁 𑀢𑁄𑀭𑀦𑀁
4. silākammamto cha upamno.
𑀲𑀺𑀮𑀸𑀓𑀁𑀫𑀁𑀢𑁄 𑀘 𑀉𑀧𑀁𑀦𑁄

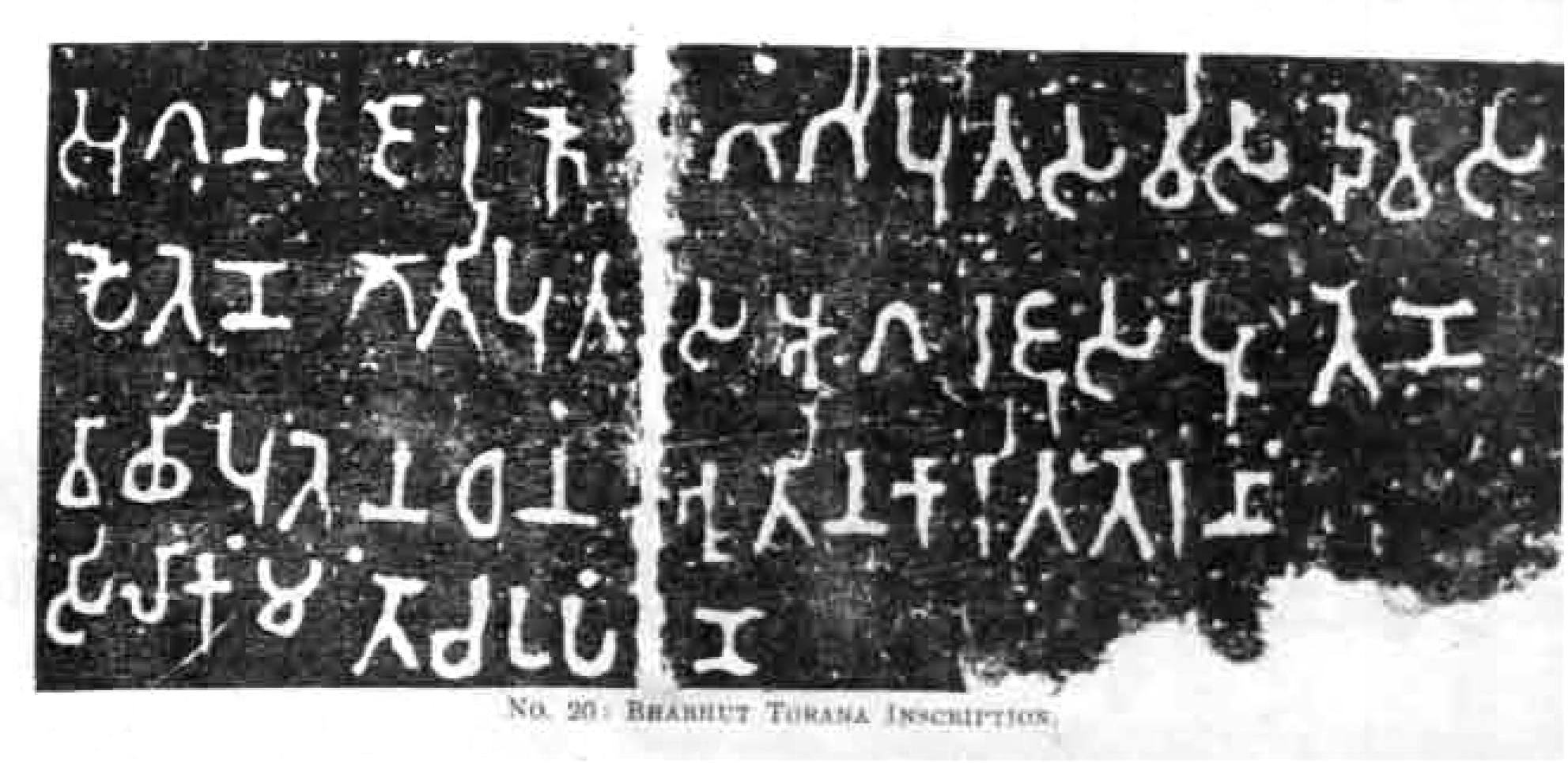

During the reign of the Sugas the gateway was caused to be made and the stone-work presented by Dhanabhūti, the son of Vāchhī, son of Agaraju, the son of a Goti and grandson of king Visadeva, the son of Gāgī.

— Gateway pillar inscription of Dhanabhūti.

==== Northern affiliation ====
Kharosthi letters on the Eastern Gateway of Bharhut
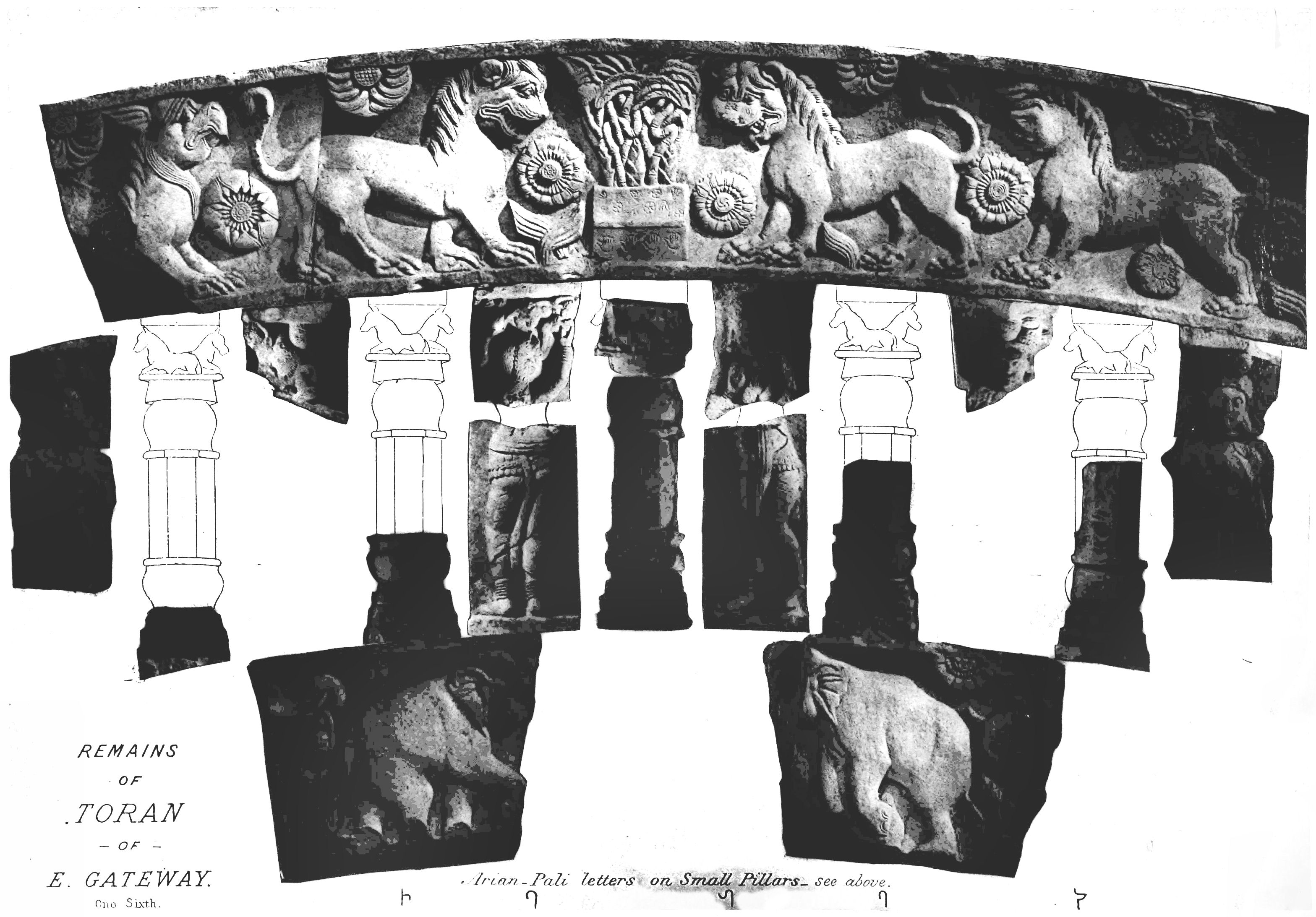
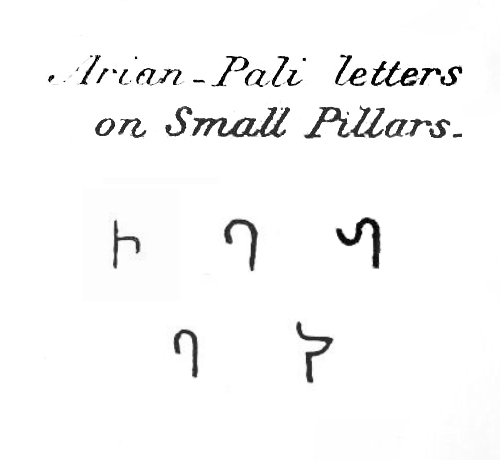
Kharoshthi (formerly called "Arian-Pali") mason's marks on the gateway:
𐨤 pa, 𐨀 a, 𐨦 ba, 𐨯 sa

It has also been proposed that the term "Sugana" refers to the Buddhist kingdom of Srughna or Sughana in Haryana, modern Sugh, and that Dhanabhuti was one of its important kings, who, besides building magnificent stupas in his capital city, also made some of the most important donations for the building of the toranas and railings at Bharhut. Alexander Cunningham, the discoverer of Bharhut, was the initial proponent of this view. In his opinion, this explained why the eastern gateway was exclusively inscribed with mason's marks in Kharoshthi, a typical script of the northwest of the subcontinent, by opposition to the local Brahmi script, as Dhanabhuti would have sent some of his artists from the northwest to work on the sculpting of the gateways. Cunningham further suggested that king Amoghabhuti, from the same general period and location, and who shares a similar name ending with Dhanabhuti, was from the same regnal line.

=== Railing ===
There is another inscription on a railing of the southwest quadrant. This inscription confirms that Dhanabhuti was a king, although probably not a king of the Sunga dynasty. He was probably either a tributary of the Sungas, or a ruler in a neighbouring territory, such as Kosala or Panchala:

"Dhanabhutisa rahja" rail inscription at Bharhut

Dhanabhūtisa rājano putasa Kumārasa Vādha Pālasa (Dānam)

𑀥𑀦𑀪𑀽𑀢𑀺𑀲 𑀭𑀸𑀚𑀦𑁄 𑀧𑀼𑀢𑀲 𑀓𑀼𑀫𑀸𑀭𑀲 𑀯𑀸𑀥 𑀧𑀸𑀮𑀲
Gift of Rajah Danabhuti's son, the Prince Vādha Pāla

— Railway inscription of Dhana-Bhuti.

A last inscription seems to mention Dhanabhuti at Bharhut, but the inscription is defaced.

== Mathura inscription ==
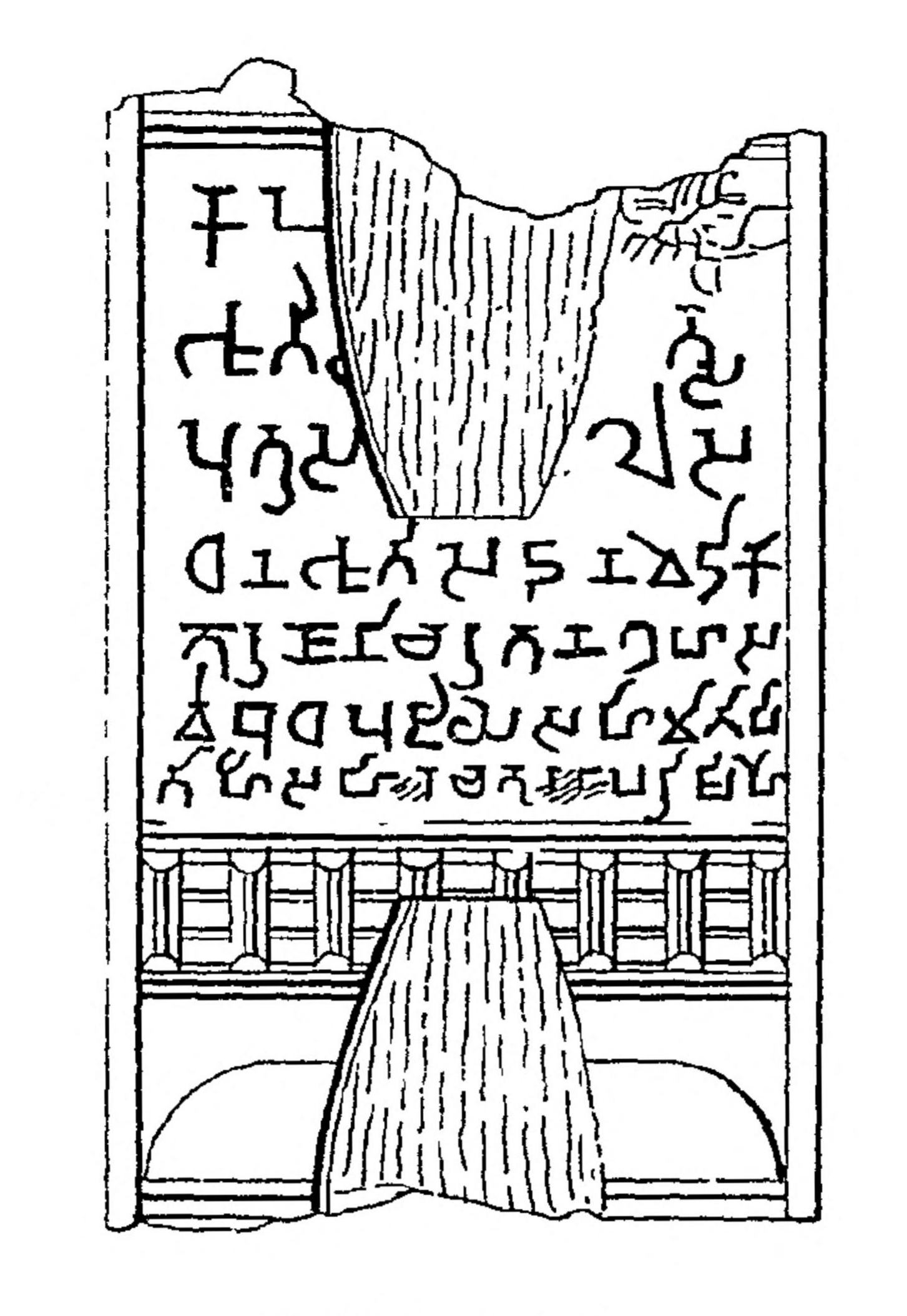
The Mathura inscription of Dhanabhuti.

The inscription at Mathura records the donation of railings and a gateway to the Buddhists samgha. It is now lost. The Dhanabhuti in the Mathura inscription could be the same person as King Dhanabhuti in the Bharhut inscription, about 322 kilometers away, and this could suggest some cultural, religious and artistic connection between the two areas.

1. kapa.....

2. bhuti.........tsa
3. putrasa........lasa
4. Dhana bhūtisa danam vedaka
5. torunana cha ratana graha sa
6. va Budha pujaye saha mata pi
7. trolisaha chaluha parishahi

— Archeological Survey of India, Report for the year 1871-72, Vol.3, Alexander Cunningham, p.36

Again, this inscription suggests that Dhanabhuti was probably not a Sunga king, as the Indo-Greeks were likely ruling Mathura at the time the inscription was made: they are thought to have ruled the area of Mathura between 185 BCE-85 BCE, as suggested by literary, numismatic and epigraphical evidence such as the Yavanarajya inscription.

The paleography of the Danabhuti Mathura inscription is considered as similar to that of inscriptions in the name of Sodasa, dating to c. 15 CE, such as the Amohini tablet.

== Compared paleography ==
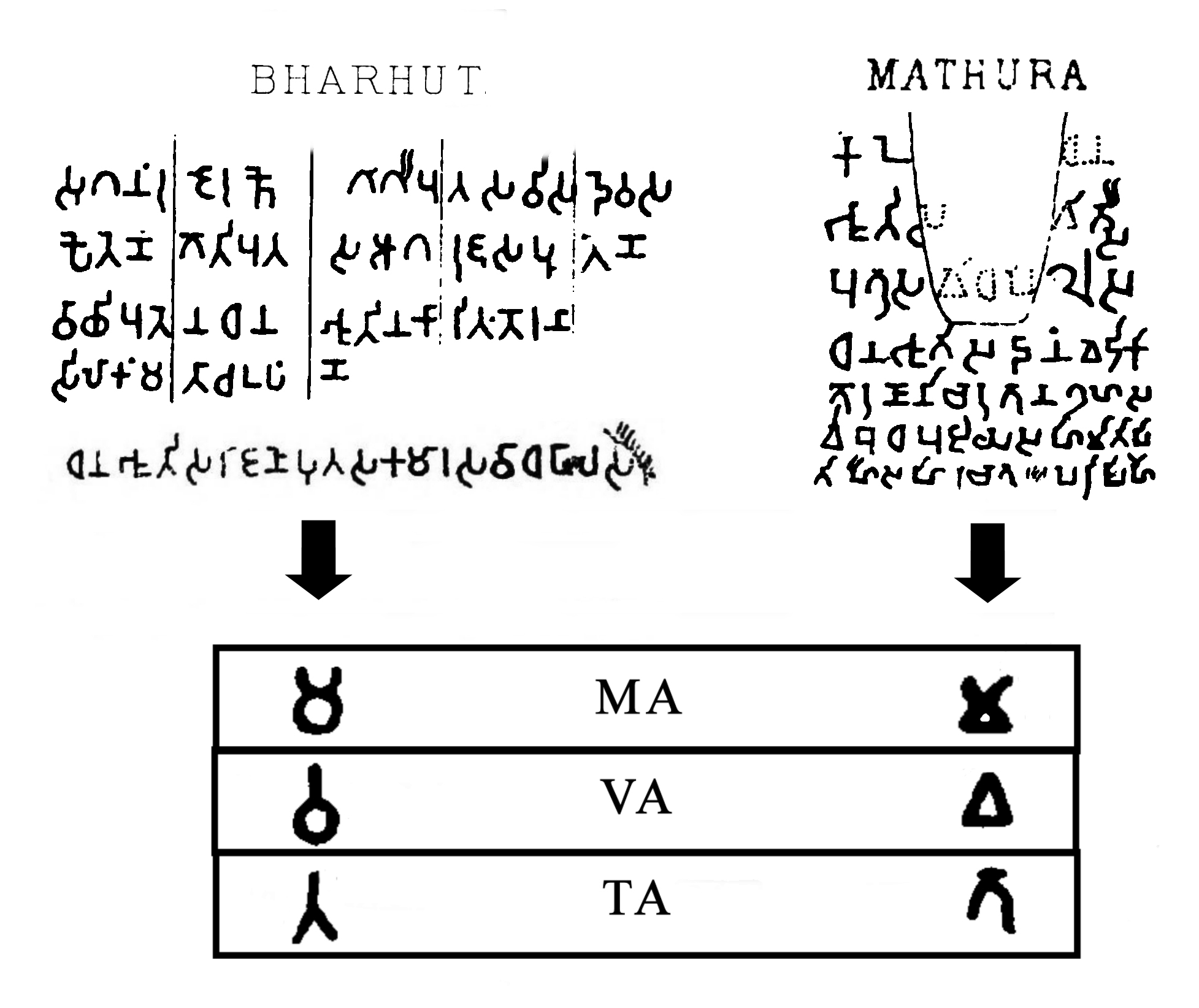
Compared paleography of the Dhanabhuti inscriptions in Bharhut and Mathura. The Brahmi letters in Bharhut (left) are close to those of Ashoka, while the Brahmi letters in Mathura (right) are similar to those of Sodasa circa 15 CE.

The paleography of the Dhanabhuti inscriptions, when inscriptions from Bharhut and Mathura are compared, raises a few issues. The Brahmi script used in Bharhut is of a rounded type rather similar to the shapes of the script used at the time of Ashoka. The Brahmi script used in the Mathura inscription is more angular and typical of the Northern Satraps period in the 1st century CE. In particular, the script of the Mathura inscription is considered as virtually identical with the script used by the Northern Satrap Sodasa in Mathura circa 15 CE. According to Cunningham, because of these paleographical differences, the Dhanabhuti of Bharhut and the Dhanabhuti of Mathura were at least separated by 50 years, and the latter may have been the grandson of the former. This remains a stumbling block in securely identifying the Dhanabhutis of Mathura and Bharhut as the same person.

According to several authors, the difference is attributable not to a distance in time, but to the geographical distance and the possibly more conservative context of Bharhut, which would have preserved older forms of writing, while Mathura may have adopted new forms earlier. Although the writing style remains traditional, some of the shapes of the Bharhut torana inscription have some modern features, such as the shapes of the letters va, ha, pa, ra, and the long flourish of the i, which suggest a closer temporal proximity with the Mathura inscription.

For Sonya Rhie Quintanilla, this implies that Dhanabhuti belonged to the period circa 150 BCE, when he probably made both dedicatory inscriptions in Bharhut and Mathura. She considers that the Brahmi script in Mathura was thus virtually identical between circa 150 BCE, her dating for the Mathura Dhanabhuti inscription, and circa 15 CE, the widely acknowledged dating for the Sodasa inscriptions. On the contrary, historian Ajit Kumar, by equalling the timing of both inscriptions of Dhanabhuti with the inscriptions of Sodasa, claims that Dhanabuthi lived in the 1st century CE, and that the monuments of Bharhut or Sanchi are also from this rather late period, long after the Sungas had declined.
