= Mitra dynasty =

The Mitra dynasty were several, possibly related, dynasties ruling in different regions of India:

- Mitra dynasty (Ayodhya), Devamitra, sometimes called the "Late Mitra dynasty of Kosala"
- Mitra dynasty (Kosambi), rulers of Vatsa (now Allahabad), c. 100 BCE–350 CE
- Mitra dynasty (Mathura), rulers of Mathura, c. 150–50 BCE
- Mitra dynasty (Panchala), in Pañcāla

== See also ==
- Mitra (disambiguation)
