= Minor Inscriptions of Kharavela =

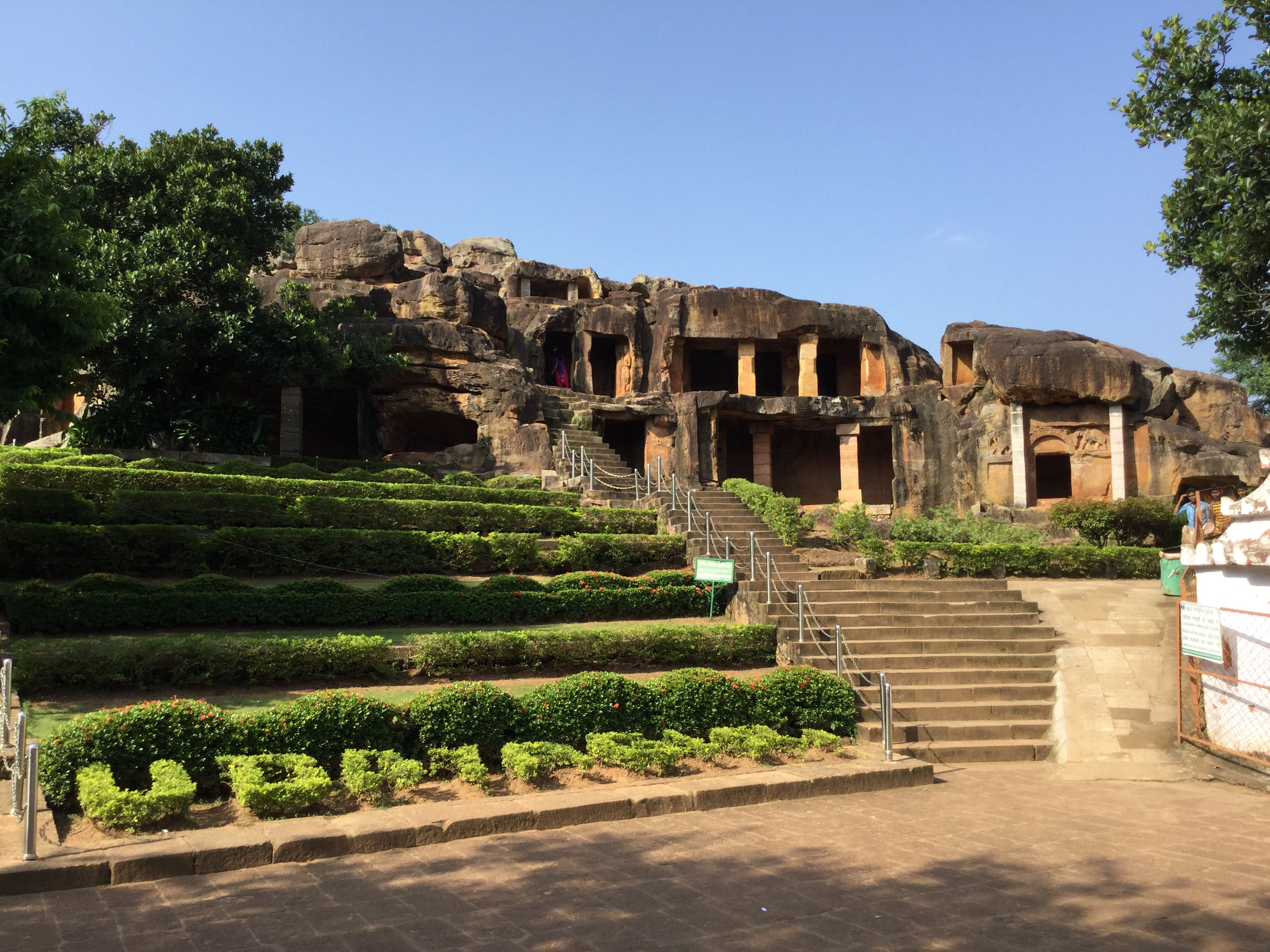
The Udayagiri and Khandagiri caves in Odisha feature many inscriptions

The Minor Inscriptions of Kharavela are the shorter inscriptions found near the major and celebrated Hathigumpha inscription of Kharavela in the twin hills of Udayagiri and Khandagiri Caves near Bhubanesvar, Odisha, India. These are inscribed on the walls or front of the caves in Brāhmī script and Prakrit language. They were published and deciphered by R. D. Banerji during the years 1915–16 (Epigraphic Indica – XIII). Others such as B. M Barua (Indian Historical Quarterly-XIV) have also published their comments on these. These minor inscriptions mention the construction of caves for Jain monks during or during the decades following the reign of Kharavela (in or around 1st-century BCE).

== Inscriptions ==
=== I: Mancapuri cave inscription (Upper storey) ===
This inscription is engraved on the raised space between the second and third doorways of the cave at Mancapuri. The text in Devanagari script is:

L.1: अरहंत पसादाय कलिंगानं समनानं लेनं कारितं राजिनो ललाकस (this is a transliteration in Devanagari of the original Brahmi)

L.2: हथिसिहस पपोतस धुतुना कलिंग चकवतिनो सिरिखारवेलस

L.3: अगमहिसिना कारितं

Translation: This temple of the Arahats (and) cave for the Sramanas of Kalinga has been made. It has been made by the chief queen of the illustrious Kharavela, the overlord of Kalinga, who was the daughter of King Lalaka – the grandson of Hastisahasa (or Hastisaha). (Translated by RD Banerji)

=== II and III: Mancapuri cave other inscriptions ===
These are found on the upper storey and lower storey, front wall.

Upper secondary

(..ऐरस) महाराजस कलिंगाधिपतिना महामेघवाहनस कुदेपसिरिनो लेणं (this is a transliteration in Devanagari of the original Brahmi)

Translation: (This is) the cave of the clever, the King, Master of Kalinga, whose vehicle is the great cloud, Kudepasiri.

lower storey

कुमारो वडुखस लेणं (IAST: kumāro vadukhas lenam) (this is a transliteration in Devanagari of the original Brahmi)

Translation: (This is) the cave of Prince Vaḍukha.

On paleographic grounds, R. D. Banerjee considered this inscription to pre-date the inscription of King Kudepasiri.

=== IV: Inscriptions in the Sarpagumpha (over doorway) ===
This inscription consisting of one line, is incised over the doorway of the Sarpagumpha. The text in Devanagari script is:

चूलकमस कोठाजेया च (IAST: cūlakamas koţhājeyā ca) (this is a transliteration in Devanagari of the original Brahmi)

Translation: The unsurpassable chamber of Chulakama

=== V: Inscription in the Sarpagumpha (left of doorway) ===
This is likely dated to the decades after Kaharvela's reign based on palaeography. The text of the engravings at the left of the doorway in Devanagari script is:

L.1: कंमस हलखि (this is a transliteration in Devanagari of the original Brahmi)

L.2: णय च पसादो

Translation: The temple (donated by) of Kamma and Halakhina.

The use of word Pasado (Sanskrit: Prasad) for temple is notable, as it is also found at the Mathura archaeological site.

=== VI: Haridas Cave inscription ===
This inscription contains one line has been incised over one of the three entrances to the main chamber of the cave from the veranda. The text in Devanagari script is:

चूलकमस पसातो कोठाजेया च (IAST: cūlakamas pasāto koţhājeyā ca) (this is a transliteration in Devanagari of the original Brahmi)

Translation: The temple and unsurpassable chamber of Chulakrama.

=== VII: Vyāghragumphā (Bagh Cave) Inscription ===
The record is incised on the outer wall of the inner chamber. The text in Devanagari script is:

L.1: नगर अखंदस (this is a transliteration in Devanagari of the original Brahmi)

L.2: स भूतिनो लेणं

Translation: The cave of the town-judge Sabhuti (Subhuti).

=== VIII: Jambesavara cave inscription ===
This inscription has been engraved over the entrances to the inner chamber of the cave. The text in Devanagari script is:

महादस बरयाय नकियस लेनं (this is a transliteration in Devanagari of the original Brahmi)

Translation: The cave of Nākiya, wife of Mahamada.

=== X: Tatowāgumphā inscription (Cave No 1) ===
The record of this inscription is incised over one of the entrances to the inner chamber. The text in Sanskrit reads as:

पादमुलिकस कुसुमस लेणं x [॥] (IAST: pādamulikas kusumas lenam x) (this is a transliteration in Devanagari of the original Brahmi)

Translation: The cave of Kusuma, the servant of (or an inhabitant of Padamulika).

There is a syllable after the word lenam marked "x" above, may be read as ni or phi and appears superfluous.

=== XI: Ananta Gumpha inscription (A) ===
The record is incised on the architrave between the left ante and the fifth pillar. The text in Devanagari script is:

दोहद समणनं लेणं (this is a transliteration in Devanagari of the original Brahmi)

Translation: The cave of the monks of Dohada.

== Other inscriptions ==
The caves have a painted inscription in Tatwagumpha from between 100 BCE to 100 CE, which is largely lost other than some characters such as "na", "ta", "tha" "da", "dha", "na" ..... "pa pha ba..." that appear to recite the traditional Indian alphabet over and over again. Smaller fragments of Brahmi inscription exist elsewhere. In the Navamuni cave, two inscriptions from the 10th or 11th-century CE are found. Similarly others caves have Jaina inscriptions in poor quality Sanskrit.

Timeline and cultural period	Indus plain (Punjab-Sapta Sindhu-Gujarat)	Gangetic Plain			Central India	Southern India
Timeline and cultural period	Indus plain (Punjab-Sapta Sindhu-Gujarat)	Upper Gangetic Plain (Ganga-Yamuna doab)	Middle Gangetic Plain	Lower Gangetic Plain	Central India	Southern India
IRON AGE
Culture	Late Vedic Period	Late Vedic Period; Painted Grey Ware culture	Late Vedic Period; Northern Black Polished Ware		Pre-history	
6th century BCE	Gandhara	Kuru-Panchala	Magadha		Adivasi (tribes)	Assaka
Culture	Persian-Greek influences	"Second Urbanisation"; Rise of Shramana movements Jainism - Buddhism - Ājīvika - Yoga			Pre-history	
5th century BCE	(Persian conquests)		Shaishunaga dynasty		Adivasi (tribes)	Assaka
4th century BCE	(Greek conquests)	Nanda empire				
HISTORICAL AGE
Culture	Spread of Buddhism				Pre-history	
3rd century BCE	Maurya Empire					Satavahana dynasty Sangam period (300 BCE – 200 CE); Early Cholas; Early Pandyan kingdom Cheras
Culture	Preclassical Hinduism (Note: Michaels (2004) p.39) - "Hindu Synthesis" (Note: Hiltebeitel (2002)) (ca. 200 BCE - 300 CE) (Note: Michaels (2004) p.39) (Note: Hiltebeitel (2002)); Epics - Puranas - Ramayana - Mahabharata - Bhagavad Gita - Brahma Sutras - Smarta Tradition; Mahayana Buddhism					
2nd century BCE	Indo-Greek Kingdom		Shunga Empire; Maha-Meghavahana Dynasty			Satavahana dynasty Sangam period (300 BCE – 200 CE); Early Cholas; Early Pandyan kingdom Cheras
1st century BCE	Indo-Greek Kingdom		Shunga Empire; Maha-Meghavahana Dynasty			Satavahana dynasty Sangam period (300 BCE – 200 CE); Early Cholas; Early Pandyan kingdom Cheras
1st century CE	Indo-Scythians; Indo-Parthians		Kuninda Kingdom			Satavahana dynasty Sangam period (300 BCE – 200 CE); Early Cholas; Early Pandyan kingdom Cheras
2nd century	Kushan Empire					Satavahana dynasty Sangam period (300 BCE – 200 CE); Early Cholas; Early Pandyan kingdom Cheras
3rd century	Kushano-Sasanian Kingdom; Western Satraps	Kushan Empire		Kamarupa kingdom	Adivasi (tribes)	Satavahana dynasty Sangam period (300 BCE – 200 CE); Early Cholas; Early Pandyan kingdom Cheras
Culture	"Golden Age of Hinduism"(ca. CE 320-650) (Note: Michaels (2004) p.40); Puranas - Kural; Co-existence of Hinduism and Buddhism					
4th century	Kidarites	Gupta Empire; Varman dynasty				Andhra Ikshvakus; Kalabhra dynasty Kadamba Dynasty; Western Ganga Dynasty
5th century	Hephthalite Empire	Alchon Huns				Vishnukundina; Kalabhra dynasty
6th century	Nezak Huns; Kabul Shahi; Maitraka				Adivasi (tribes)	Vishnukundina; Badami Chalukyas; Kalabhra dynasty
Culture	Late-Classical Hinduism (ca. CE 650-1100) (Note: Michaels (2004) p.41); Advaita Vedanta - Tantra; Decline of Buddhism in India					
7th century	Indo-Sassanids		Vakataka dynasty Empire of Harsha	Mlechchha dynasty	Adivasi (tribes)	Badami Chalukyas; Eastern Chalukyas; Pandyan kingdom (revival); Pallava
7th century	Karkota dynasty				Adivasi (tribes)	
8th century	Kabul Shahi	Pala Empire			Adivasi (tribes)	Eastern Chalukyas; Pandyan kingdom Kalachuri
9th century	Gurjara-Pratihara				Adivasi (tribes)	Rashtrakuta Empire; Eastern Chalukyas; Pandyan kingdom Medieval Cholas; Chera Perumals of Makkotai
10th century	Ghaznavids			Pala dynasty Kamboja-Pala dynasty	Adivasi (tribes)	Kalyani Chalukyas; Eastern Chalukyas; Medieval Cholas; Chera Perumals of Makkotai; Rashtrakuta
References and sources for table References Sources: Flood, Gavin D. (1996), An Introduction to Hinduism, Cambridge University Press; Hiltebeitel, Alf (2002), Hinduism. In: Joseph Kitagawa, "The Religious Traditions of Asia: Religion, History, and Culture", Routledge; Michaels, Axel (2004), Hinduism. Past and present, Princeton, New Jersey: Princeton University Press
