= Kodavatiganti Rohini Prasad =

Indian author and scientist

- Died: 8 September 2012; Mumbai, Maharashtra, India
- Education: Ph.D in Nuclear Physics
- Alma mater: Andhra University, Bombay University
- Occupations: Scientist, Author
- Spouse: Lalita
- Children: Karthik, Yamini
- Parents: Kodavatiganti Kutumbarao (father); Varudhini (mother)

Kodavatiganti Rohini Prasad (14 September 1949 – 8 September 2012) was an author and retired scientist of Bhabha Atomic Research Centre, Mumbai. He was the son of the Telugu writer Kodavatiganti Kutumbarao. Kodavatiganti wrote books on Science, Music, and other subjects in his mother tongue Telugu. He also wrote in several online magazines. He also researched the Hindustani classical music.

== Personal life ==
Rohini Prasad was born to Kodavatiganti Kutumba Rao, Varudhini. His maternal uncle Kommuri Sambasiva Rao is a Telugu author. He completed M.Sc in Nuclear physics from Andhra University, Visakhapatnam. After that he joined Bhabha Atomic Research Center, Trombay as a research scientist. He got his PhD from Bombay University for his research on Radio Activity devices. He worked there for 30 years and then retired. After his retirement he worked as a consultant in Atlanta, United States. He also worked as a consultant in ECIL.

== Death ==
He died on 8 September 2012 in Mumbai from complications related to Diabetes. As he was a rationalist and a scientist, his family decided to donate his body to a medical college instead of the customary cremation.
