= Rohini Nanayakkara =

Sri Lankan banker

Rohini Nanayakkara is a retired bank executive from Sri Lanka.

== Biography ==
Nanayakkara grew up in a family of seven children. She studied economics at the University of Ceylon at Peradeniya, graduating in 1959.

She joined the Bank of Ceylon in 1959 as a staff assistant. In 1988, she became the bank's general manager and chief executive. She held this position until her retirement in 1996.

After retiring, she helped establish Seylan Bank, and was appointed general manager of the Ministry of Finance's Private Sector Infrastructure Development Company. In 2005, she was appointed a member of the government's Task Force to Rebuild the Nation. She has served as chair of Lanka Orix Leasing Company (LOLC) and Browns Group.

Nanayakkara has served as chairperson of the Sri Lanka Bankers Association and chairperson of the Association of Professional Bankers – Sri Lanka.

In 2011, Nanayakkara published her memoirs, titled What Glass Ceiling? The Memoirs of Rohini Nanayakkara.
