= Rohini (Buddha's disciple) =

Rohiṇī

Personal life
- Born: Kapilavastu
- Parent: King Amṛtodana (father)
- Occupation: Upāsikā, Princess

Religious life
- Religion: Buddhism

Senior posting
- Teacher: Gautama Buddha

Rohiṇī was a princess of the Śākyas and sister of Anuruddha. She is a Sotāpanna.

== Story ==
When Anuruddha, cousin and one of the ten principal disciples of the Buddha, visited his family in Kapilavastu, his sister Rohiṇī refused to see him because she was suffering from a skin disease. Anuruddha was persistent and requested her presence. She arrived with her face covered with a cloth in shame due to her condition. Her brother advised her to sell some of her clothing and jewellery and have a refectory constructed for the Buddha and his monastics, as this would bring great merit. Rohiṇī did as she was advised and was assisted by her relatives. The construction was supervised by Anuruddha. He instructed her to fill the kamaṇḍalu (water pots) every day and sweep the hall floors. She did so and began to slowly recover from her disease.

Once the hall was complete, the Buddha was invited to partake of food given as alms. After finishing his meal, he sent for Rohiṇī. He asked her if she knew the reason for her affliction. She replied that she did not, so the Buddha told her a story of her past.

Rohiṇī had once, in a past life, been the queen consort of the king of Varanasi. The king had a favourite dancing girl, and the queen became incredibly jealous of her and plotted a scheme against her. One day, she had her attendant put some itching powder made of cowhage pods in the dancer's bed. They called the dancer, and when she arrived, they threw the powder on her. In pain and desperation, the girl sought refuge in her bed, which caused her even more suffering.

The Buddha concluded that Rohiṇī had come to her current condition due to this evil deed. He exhorted his audience with the following verse:

One should give up anger, renounce pride, and overcome all fetters. Suffering never befalls him who clings not to mind and body and is detached.

— Verse 221, the Dhammapada

After this discourse, many in the congregation attained the fruit of the sotāpanna. Rohiṇī also became a sotāpanna, and her disease disappeared.

== Rebirth in Heaven ==
After death, Rohiṇī was reborn in Trāyastriṃśa as a beautiful goddess, at the boundary of the territories among four deities. They became enamored with her beauty and each deity laid claim unto her. Unable to settle their dispute, they sought the advice of Śakra, the lord of Trāyastriṃśa.

Upon seeing her, Śakra turned to the gods and asked them of the condition of their minds upon seeing this new goddess. One god said that his mind was tumultuous like battlefield, the second said his mind was racing swiftly like a mountain river, the third said that he could not take his eyes off her, as if they were seized in a crab's claw. The fourth replied that his mind would not keep still and whipped about like a flag in the wind.

Śakra declared, “Your minds are over-powered by this form. As for myself, I want to live; I do not want to die. And if I do not get Rohiṇī then I shall surely die.”

The gods complied to Śakra's heavenly authority. He took Rohiṇī as his wife and they departed to enjoy various pleasures.
