= Kosambi =

- city
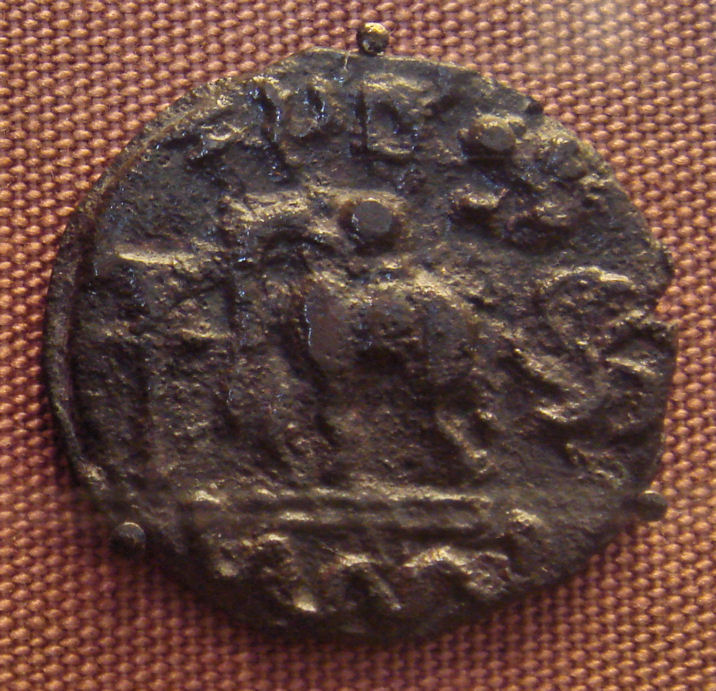
- Kosambi cast copper coin. 1st century BCE. Inscribed 𑀓𑁄𑀲𑀩𑀺 Kosabi in the Brahmi script at the top. British Museum.

- Location within India Location within Uttar Pradesh
- Coordinates: 25.338984°N 81.392899°E
- Country: India
- State: Uttar Pradesh
- District: Kaushambi district

Kosambi (Pali) or Kaushambi (Sanskrit) was an ancient city in India, characterized by its importance as a trading center along the Ganges Plain and its status as the capital of the Vatsa Kingdom, one of the sixteen mahajanapadas. It was located on the Yamuna River about 56 kilometres (35 mi) southwest of its confluence with the Ganges at Prayaga (modern Prayagraj), which made it a powerful center for trade and beneficial for the Vatsa Kingdom.

== History ==
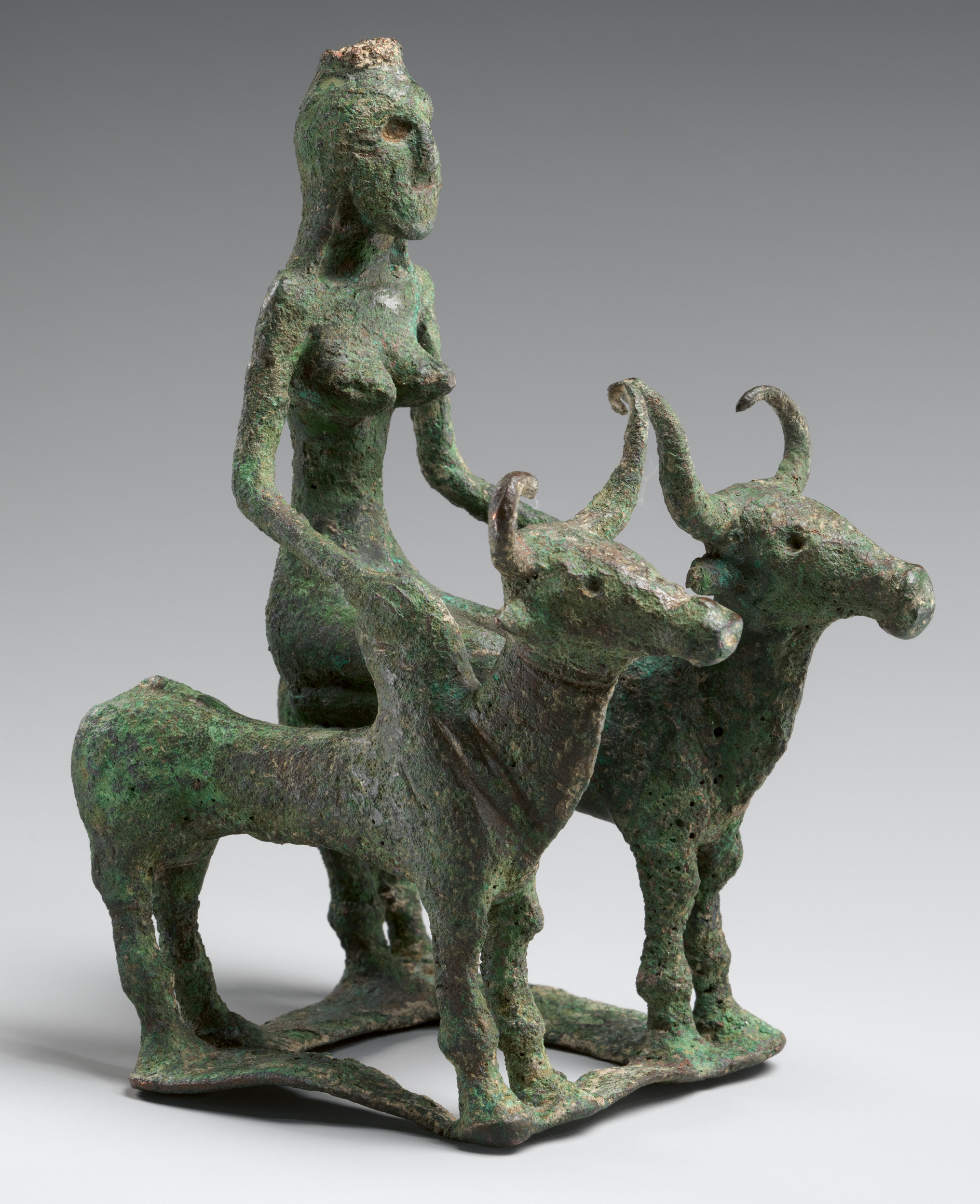
Woman riding two bulls (bronze), from Kausambi, c. 2000-1750 BCE

During the 2nd millennium BCE Ochre Coloured Pottery culture spread in the region.

Kosambi was one of the greatest cities in India from the late Vedic period until the end of the Maurya Empire with occupation continuing until the Gupta Empire. As a small town, it was established in the late Vedic period, by the rulers of thu Kuru Kingdom as their new capital. The initial Kuru capital, Hastinapur, was destroyed by floods, and the Kuru King transferred his entire capital with the subjects to a new capital that he built near the Ganga-Jamuna confluence, which was 56 km away from the southernmost part of the Kuru Kingdom, and is now known as Prayagraj, previously called Allahabad.

During the period prior the Maurya Empire, Kosambi was the capital of the independent kingdom of Vatsa, one of the Mahajanapadas. Kosambi was a very prosperous city by the time of Gautama Buddha, at which point it was a place where a large number of wealthy merchants resided. Kosambi was an important entrepôt of goods and passengers from north-west and south. It figures very prominently in the accounts of the life of Buddha.

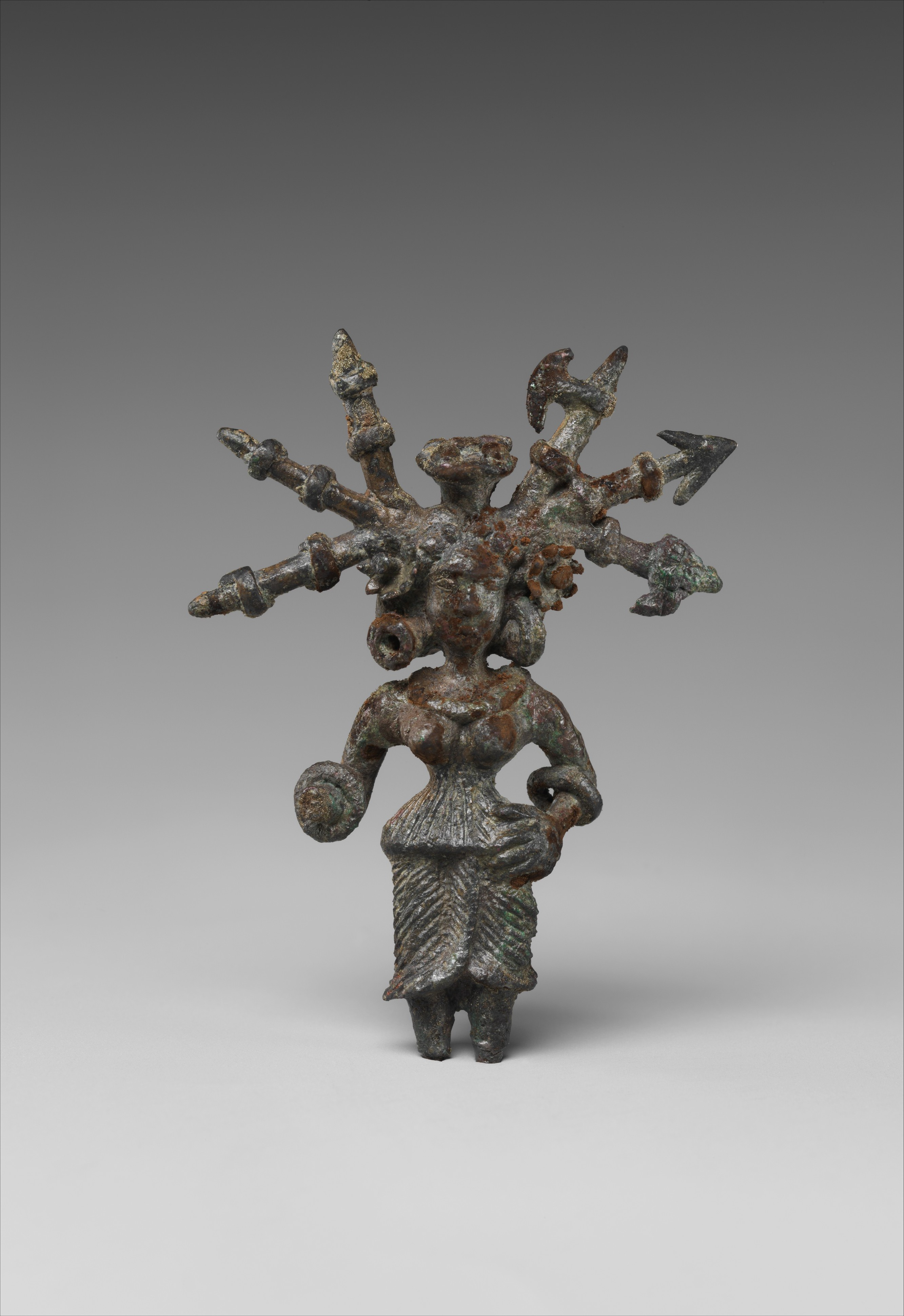
Bronze Goddess with weapons in her hair, from northern India (possibly Kausambi), 2nd century BCE

Historically, Kosambi remained a solid urban centre through the Mauryan period and during the Gupta period. Pillars of Ashoka are found both in Kosambi and in Prayagraj. The present location of the Kosambi pillar inside the ruins of the fort attests to the existence of Mauryan military presence in the region. The Allahabad pillar is an edict issued toward the Mahamattas of Kosambi, giving credence to the fact that it was originally located in Kosambi.

The schism edict of Kaushambi (Minor Pillar Edict 2) states that, "The King instructs the officials of Kausambi as follows: ..... The way of the Sangha must not be abandoned..... Whosoever shall break the unity of Sangha, whether monk or nun from this time forth, shall be compelled to wear white garments, and to dwell in a place outside the sangha."

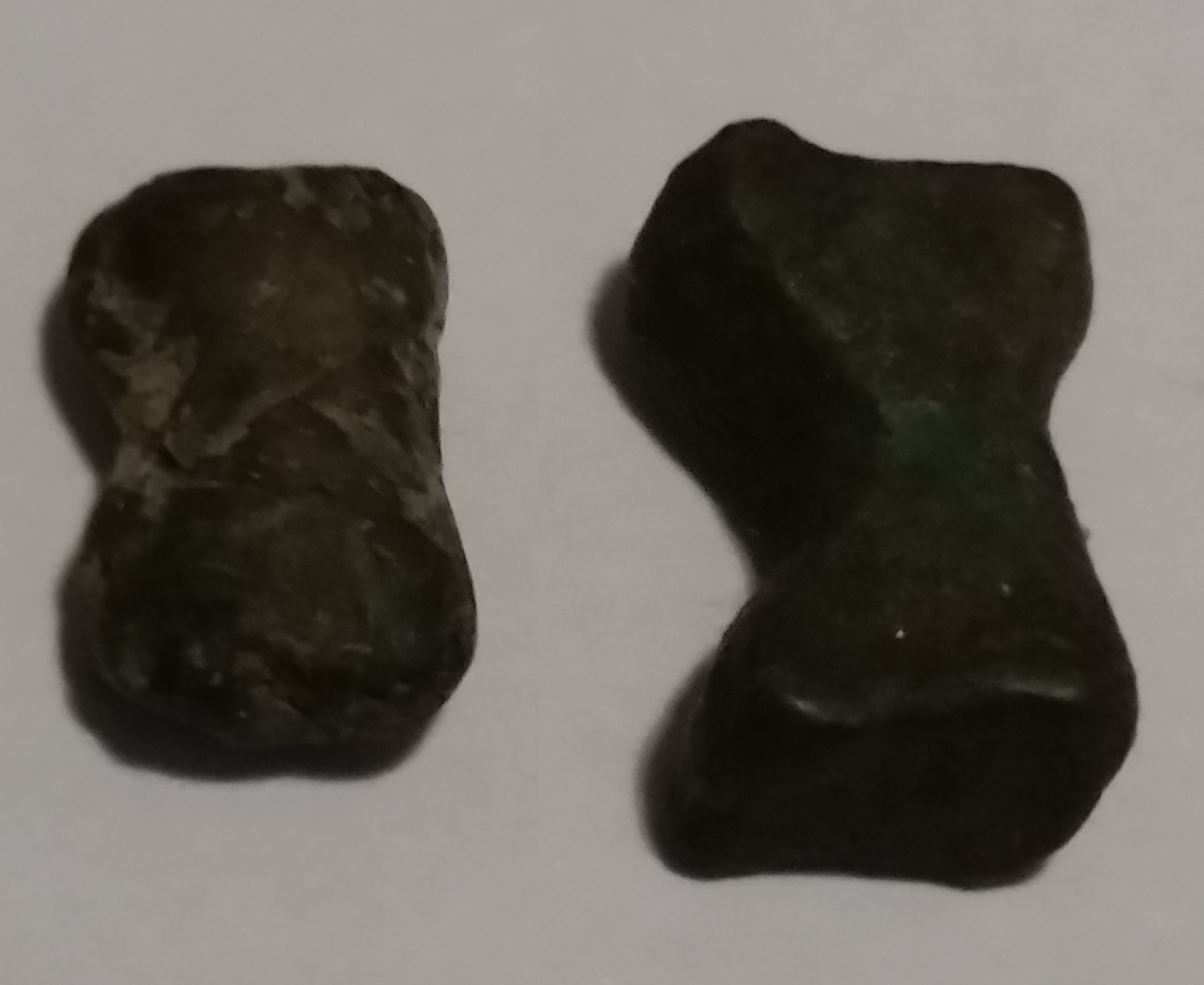
Two Damaru-shaped coins from the Gangetic Valley.

In the post-Mauryan period a tribal society at Kosambi (modern Prayagraj district) made cast copper coinage with and without punchmarks. Their coinage resemble the Damaru-drum. All such coinage has been attributed to the Kosambi. Many Indian museums, such as the National Museum, have these coins in their collections.

It is possible that Pushyamitra Shunga may have shifted his capital from Pataliputra to Kaushambi. After his death, his empire was divided (perhaps amongst his sons), into several Mitra dynasties. The dynasty of Kaushambi also established hegemony over a wide area including Magadha, and possibly Kannauj as well.

All sources cite Kausambi as an important site during the period. More than three thousand stone sculptures have been recovered from Kausambi and its neighbouring ancient sites –7 Mainhai, Bhita, Mankunwar, and Deoria. These are currently housed in the Prof. G.R. Sharma Memorial Museum of the Department of Ancient History, University of Allahabad, Allahabad Museum and State Museum in Lucknow.

The excavations of the archaeological site of Kosambi was done by G. R. Sharma of Allahabad University in 1949 and again in 1951–1956 after it was authorized by Sir Mortimer Wheeler in March 1948. Excavations have suggested that the site may have been occupied as early as the 12th century BCE. Its strategic geographical location helped it emerge as an important trading center. According to James Heitzman, a large rampart of piled mud was constructed in the 7th to 5th centuries BCE, and was subsequently strengthened by brick walls and bastions, with numerous towers, battlements, and gateways but according to archaeologist G. R. Sharma, who led the archaeological excavation of the city, the rampart was built and provided with brick revetment between 1025 BC and 955 BC and the moat was excavated at the earliest between 855 and 815 BC. Carbon dating of charcoal and Northern Black Polished Ware have historically dated its continued occupation from 390 BC to 600 A.D.

Kosambi was a fortified town with an irregular oblong plan. Excavations of the ruins revealed the existence of gates on three sides-east, west and north. The location of the southern gate can not be precisely determined due to water erosion. Besides the bastions, gates and sub-gates, the city was encircled on three sides by a moat, which, though filled up at places, it still discernible on the northern side. At some points, however, there is evidence of more than one moat. The city extended to an area of approximately 6.5 kilometres (4.0 mi). The city shows a large extent of brickworks indicating the density of structures in the city.

The Buddhist commentarial scriptures give two reasons for the name Kausambi/Kosambī. The more favoured is that the city was so called because it was founded in or near the site of the hermitage once occupied by the sage Kusumba (v.l. Kusumbha). Another explanation is that large and stately neem trees or Kosammarukkhā grew in great numbers in and around the city.

== Jaina history of Kauśāmbī ==
As per early canonical and early and medieval non-canonical Śvetāmbara Jaina literature, four (conception, birth, initiation, and attainment of omniscience) out of Panch Kalyanaka of Padmaprabha, the 6th Tirthankara, happened at Kauśāmbī. Mahavira, the 24th Tirthankara, visited Kauśāmbī five times.

=== Archaeological evidence ===
King Candrapradyota is said to have had built a grand fort in the city. Excavations at Kauśāmbī's ancient fort revealed 4-mile-long walls, 32 gates, and some massive 30–35-foot (9.1–10.7 m) high structures. More than 12 heads of Tirthankara idols and about 6 headless Tirthankara idols seated in Padmāsana were excavated from Kauśāmbī. A 2nd century BCE inscription at Pabhosā mentions "Kassyapiya Arhats," which, according to Dr. Buhler, could mean that the author of the inscription was a Jaina as Mahavira was of the Kaśyapa lineage. Dr. Ghosh also mentions about an old Śvetāmbara Jaina dharmaśālā at Pabhosā. Huen Tsang notes that several Jaina monks used to reside in the caves at Pabhosā. A union of Jaina monks is believed to have lived here under the protection of a Śrāvaka named Ashādhasena. A 2000-year old Jaina ayagapatta was also discovered during excavation at Kauśāmbī. The inscription on the discovered ayagapatta mentions King Sivamitra and Sthavira Baladasa, a Śvetāmbara Jaina ascetic.

=== Literary mentions ===
Earliest mentions of Kauśāmbī in Jaina scriptures are found in the 5th century BCE Śvētāmbara Siddhāntha. Āvaśyaka Sūtra, one of the 45 principal and ancient canonical texts of the Jainas, mentions that Mahavira visited Kauśāmbī and that it was situated at the banks of Yamuna.

Triṣaṣṭiśalākāpuruṣacaritra, a 10th century CE non-canonical text by Ācārya Hemacandrasuri, mentions that Mahavira broke his 175 days-long fast by accepting his first alms from Candanbālā in Kauśāmbī. He further adds that after attainment of omniscience, Mahavira's Samavasarana was set up at Kauśāmbī. It also mentions that Queen Mṛgāvatī's initiation as a Jaina nun happened in this city. Pariśiṣṭaparvan, an appendix to Triṣaṣṭiśalākāpuruṣacaritra, which describes the lives of illustrious Jaina ascetics, states that Ārya Suhastinsuri and Ārya Mahāgiri, the disciples of Ācārya Sthulabhadrasuri had visited and stayed in Kauśāmbī and that Emperor Samprati had built a pillar there.

Vividha Tirtha Kalpa, a 14th century CE non-canonical text by Ācārya Jinaprabhasuri, mentions that Kauśāmbī was a center for trade and spirituality and that it became the capital city of the Vatsa Kingdom after Kuru dynasty moved from Hastinapur. It is further mentioned that locals of Kauśāmbī performed special rituals and prayers on the anniversary of Mahavira's fast breaking. Śrī Sammet Śikhara Rāsa, a 16th century non-canonical text by Śrī Jaskīrti Muni, a Śvetāmbara Jaina ascetic, mentions a sangha (a procession towards a pilgrimage site) that visited Kauśāmbī. He further adds that Śrī Anāthī Muni, a popular figure in Śvetāmbara tales, also belonged to this city. The text also mentions that Dhannā-Śālibhadra Tāl, a pond named after Śālibhadra, also a popular figure in Śvetāmbara tales, exists one Kosa (1.8 miles) from Kauśāmbī. In 1500 CE, Panyās Hansasomavijaya, a Śvetāmbara Jaina ascetic, visited Kauśāmbī and noted 64 Jaina idols. In 1605 CE, Vijaysagara, and in 1608 CE, Jayavijaya Gaṇī recorded two prominent Jaina temples in the city. By 1691 CE, Panyās Saubhāgyavijaya found only one surviving Jaina temple in a dilapidated state. By the 18th century, the last two remaining temples had also fallen into ruins. In 1978, Ācārya Prabhācandrasuri initiated the first phase of restoration efforts. An idol of Padmaprabha was installed. In 2018, Ācārya Nayavardhanasuri led a second phase of temple renovation. Currently, two major Śvetāmbara Jaina temples exist in Kauśāmbī.

== Buddhist history of Kaushambi ==
In the time of the Buddha, its king was Parantapa, and after him reigned his son Udena (Pali. Sanskrit: Udayana). Kosambī was evidently a city of great importance at the time of the Buddha for we find Ananda mentioning it as one of the places suitable for the Buddha's Parinibbāna. It was also the most important halt for traffic coming to Kosala and Magadha from the south and the west.

The city was thirty leagues by river from Benares (modern day Varanasi). (We are told that the fish which swallowed Bakkula travelled thirty leagues through the Yamunā, from Kosambī to Banares). The usual route from Rājagaha to Kosambī was up the river (this was the route taken by Ananda when he went with five hundred others to inflict the higher punishment on Channa, Vin.ii.290), though there seems to have been a land route passing through Anupiya and Kosambī to Rājagaha). In the Sutta Nipāta (vv.1010-13) the whole route is given from Mahissati to Rājagaha, passing through Kosambī, the halting-places mentioned being: Ujjeni, Gonaddha, Vedisa, Vanasavhya, Kosambī, Sāketa, Sravasthi/Sāvatthi, Setavyā, Kapilavasthu/Kapilavatthu, Kusinārā, Pāvā, Bhoganagara and Vesāli.

Near Kosambī, by the river, was Udayana/Udena's park, the Udakavana, where Ananda and Pindola Bharadvaja preached to the women of Udena's palace on two occasions. The Buddha is mentioned as having once stayed in the Simsapāvana in Kosambī. Mahā Kaccāna lived in a woodland near Kosambī after the holding of the First Buddhist Council.

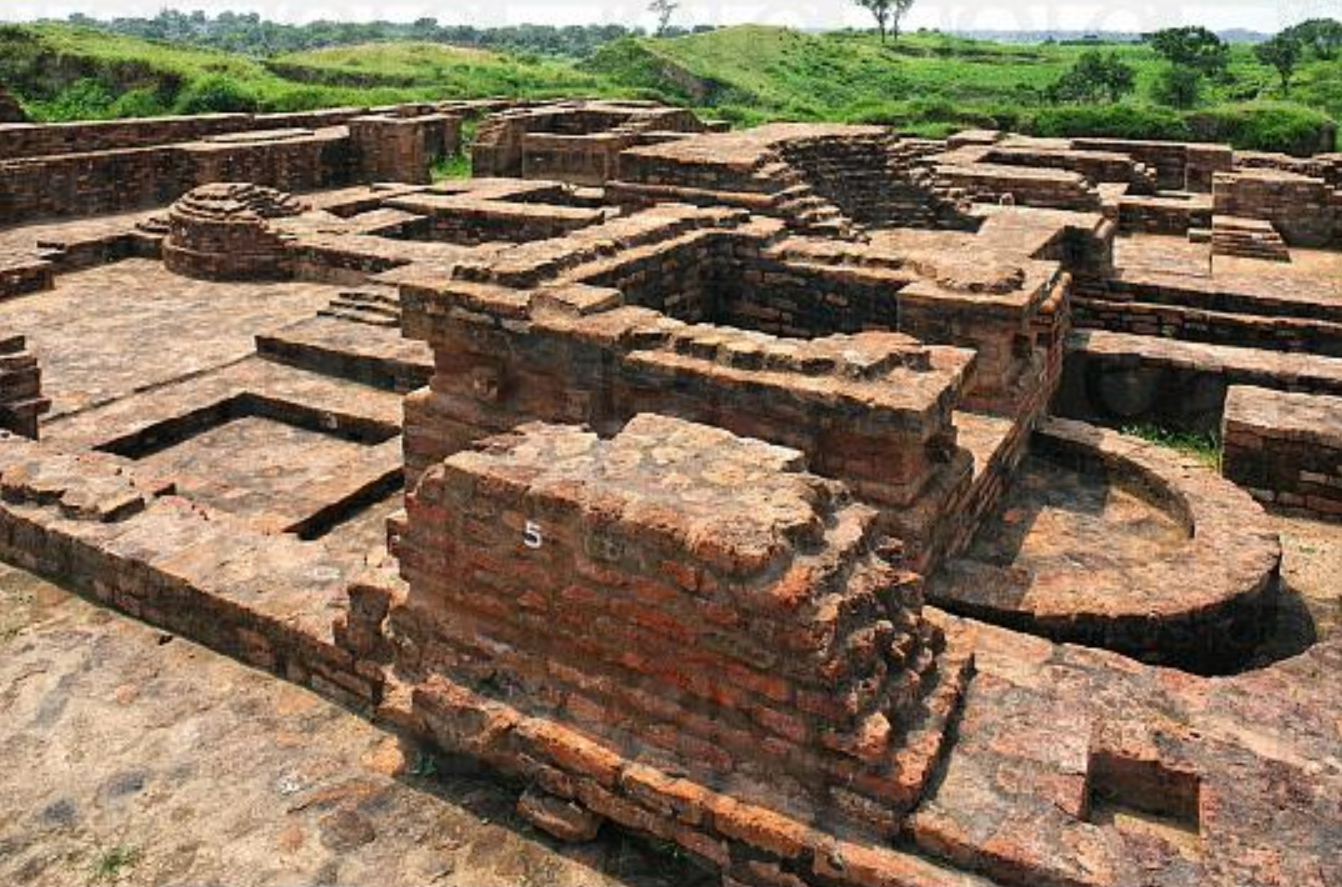
Ghoshitaram monastery in Kosambi dating back to 6th century BC

=== Buddhist monasteries in Kosambi ===
Already in the Buddha's time there were four establishments of the Order in Kosambī – the Kukkutārāma, the Ghositārāma, the Pāvārika-ambavana (these being given by three of the most eminent citizens of Kosambī, named respectively, Kukkuta, Ghosita, and Pāvārika), and the Badarikārāma. The Buddha visited Kosambī on several occasions, stopping at one or other of these residences, and several discourses delivered during these visits are recorded in the books. (Thomas, op. cit., 115, n.2, doubts the authenticity of the stories connected with the Buddha's visits to Kosambī, holding that these stories are of later invention).

The Buddha spent his ninth rainy season at Kosambī, and it was on his way there on this occasion that he made a detour to Kammāssadamma and was offered in marriage Māgandiyā, daughter of the Brahmin Māgandiya. The circumstances are narrated in connection with the Māgandiya Sutta. Māgandiyā took the Buddha's refusal as an insult to herself, and, after her marriage to King Udena (of Kosambi), tried in various ways to take revenge on the Buddha, and also on Udena's wife Sāmavatī, who had been the Buddha's follower.

=== The schism at Kaushambi ===
A great schism once arose among the monks in Kosambī. Some monks charged one of their colleagues with having committed the offence of leaving water in the dipper in the bathroom (which would let mosquitoes breed in it), but he refused to acknowledge the charge and, being himself learned in the Vinaya, argued his case and pleaded that the charge be dismissed. The rules were complicated; on the one hand, the monk had broken a rule and was treated as an offender, but on the other, he should not have been so treated if he could not see that he had done wrong. The monk was eventually excommunicated, and this brought about a great dissension. When the matter was reported to the Buddha, he admonished the partisans of both sides and urged them to give up their differences, but they paid no heed, and even blows were exchanged. The people of Kosambī, becoming angry at the monks' behaviour, the quarrel grew apace. The Buddha once more counselled concord, relating to the monks the story of King Dīghiti of Kosala, but his efforts at reconciliation were of no avail, one of the monks actually asking him to leave them to settle their differences without his interference. In disgust, the Buddha left Kosambī and, journeying through Bālakalonakāragāma and the Pācīnavamsadaya, retired alone to keep retreat in the Pārileyyaka forest. In the meantime the monks of both parties repented, partly owing to the pressure exerted by their lay followers in Kosambī, and, coming to the Buddha at Sāvatthi, they asked his pardon and settled their dispute.

=== Other legends and references in literature ===
Bakkula was the son of a banker in Kosambī. In the Buddha's time there lived near the ferry at Kosambī a powerful Nāga-king, the reincarnation of a former ship's captain. The Nāga was converted by Sāgata, who thereby won great fame. Rujā was born in a banker's family in Kosambī. Citta-pandita was also born there. A king, by name Kosambaka, once ruled there.

During the time of the Vajjian heresy, when the Vajjian monks of Vesāli wished to excommunicate Yasa Kākandakaputta, he went by air to Kosambī, and from there sent messengers to the orthodox monks in the different centres (Vin.ii.298; Mhv.iv.17).

It was at Kosambī that the Buddha promulgated a rule forbidding the use of intoxicants by monks (Vin.ii.307).

Kosambī is mentioned in the Buddhist scripture Samyutta Nikāya.

== Kausambi Palace architecture ==
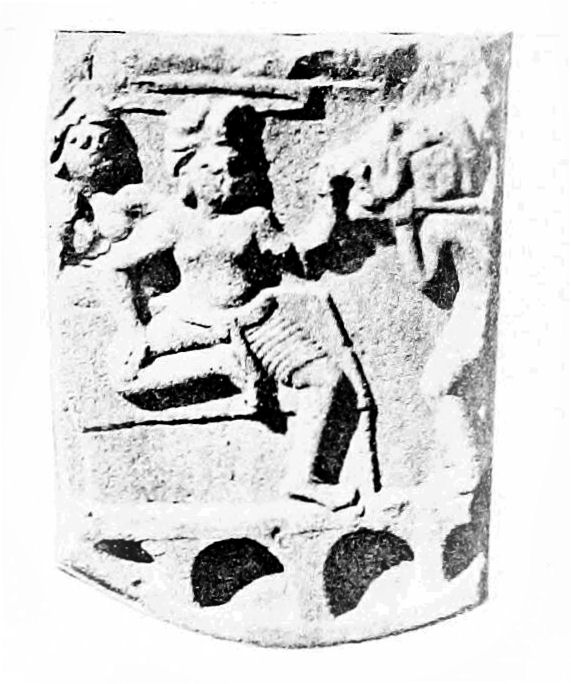
an Indian palace depiction in Mahabodhi railing medallion, showing vaulted underground chambers called ''suranga,'' as described by Kautiliya in Arthashastra; Shunga period, 2nd-1st BCE

The archaeological excavation conducted by Archaeological Survey of India (ASI) at Kausambi revealed a palace with its foundations going back to 8th century BCE until 2nd century CE and built in six phases. The last phase dated to 1st - 2nd century CE featured an extensive structure which was divided into three blocks and enclosed two galleries. There was a central hall in the central block and presumably used as an audience hall surrounded by rooms which served as a residential place for the ruler. The entire structure was constructed using bricks and stones and two layers of lime were plastered on it. The palace had a vast network of underground chambers and the superstructure and the galleries were made on the principle of true arch. The four-centered pointed arch was used to span narrow passageways and segmental arch for wider areas. The superstructure of central and eastern block was examined to have formed part of a dome that adorned the building. The entire galleries and superstructure were found collapsed under a 5-centimetre (2.0 in) thick layer of ash which indicates destruction of the palace through conflagration.

== Legacy ==
The historical Tai-Shan state of Möng Mao, between the border of China and Myanmar, adopted the name Kosambi as its classical Buddhist name.
