= Heliodorus pillar =

C. 113 BCE column in Vidisha, Madhya Pradesh, India

Coordinates: 23°32′59″N 77°48′00″E

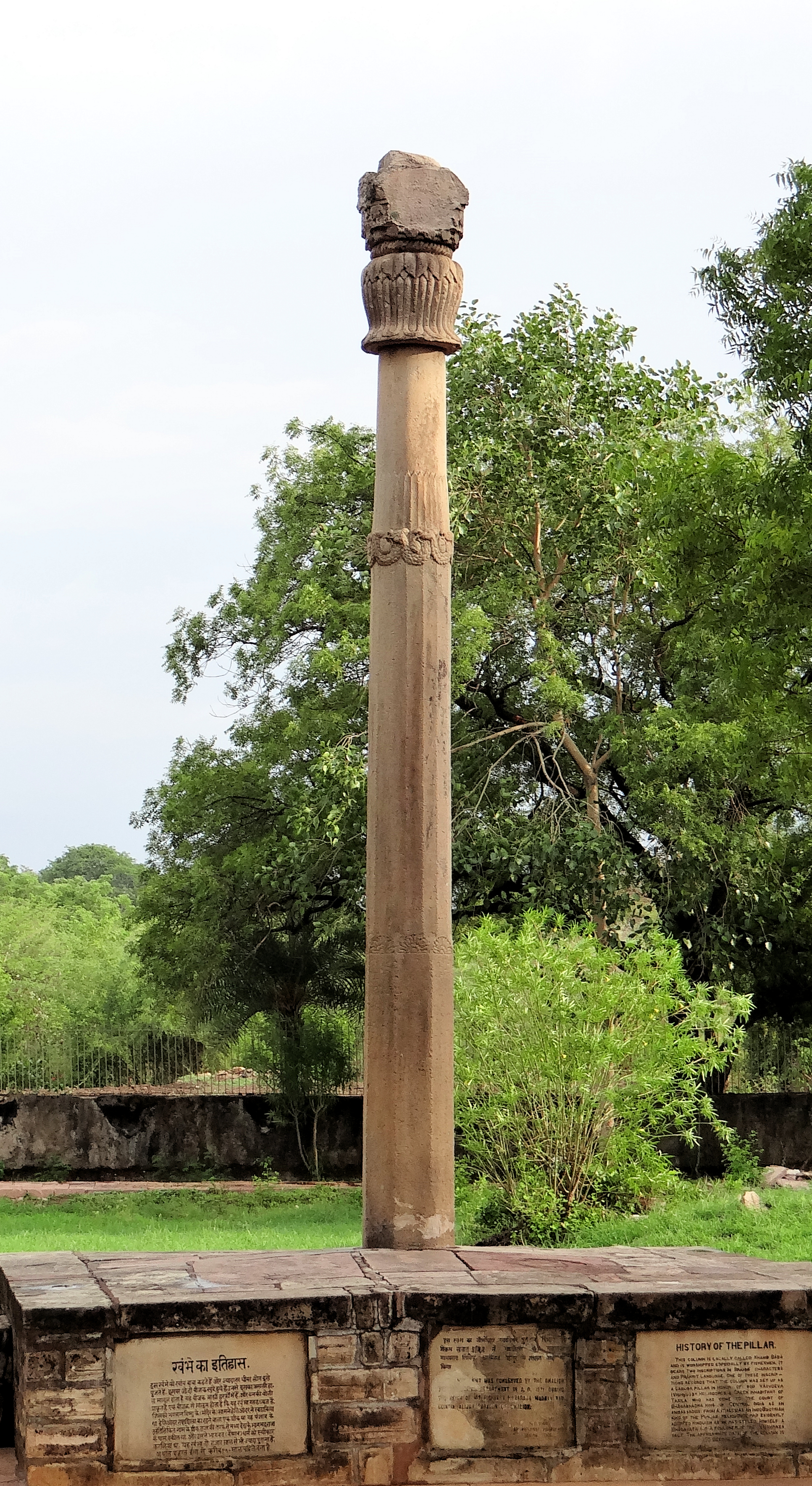
- Heliodorus pillar in Vidisha, India.
- Created: 113 BCE
- Period/culture: late 2nd Century BCE
- Place: Vidisha, Madhya Pradesh, India.
- Present location: Vidisha, India

Location
- The Heliodorus pillar was erected and dedicated by Heliodorus, an Indo-Greek ambassador to the Shunga Empire

The Heliodorus pillar is a stone column that was erected around 113 BCE in central India in Besnagar (Vidisha), Madhya Pradesh. The pillar is commonly named after Heliodorus (Greek: Ηλιόδωρος) (identified by him as a Garuda-standard), who was an ambassador of the Indo-Greek king Antialcidas from Taxila, and was sent to the Indian ruler Bhagabhadra. A dedication written in Brahmi script was inscribed on the pillar, venerating Vāsudeva (Krishna), the Deva deva the "God of Gods" and the Supreme Deity. The pillar also glorifies the Indian ruler as "Bhagabhadra the savior". The pillar is a stambha which symbolizes joining earth, space and heaven, and is thought to connote the "cosmic axis" and express the cosmic totality of the Deity.

The Heliodorus pillar site is located near the confluence of two rivers, about 60 kilometres (37 mi) northeast from Bhopal, 11 kilometres (6.8 mi) from the Buddhist stupa of Sanchi, and 4 kilometres (2.5 mi) from the Hindu Udayagiri site.

The pillar was discovered by Alexander Cunningham in 1877. Two major archaeological excavations in the 20th-century have revealed the pillar to be a part of an ancient Vāsudeva temple site. Aside from religious scriptures such as the Bhagavad Gita, the epigraphical inscriptions on the Heliodorus pillar and the Hathibada Ghosundi Inscriptions contain some of the earliest known writings of Vāsudeva-Krishna devotion and early Vaishnavism and are considered the first archeological evidence of its existence. The pillar has been called one of the earliest surviving records of a foreign convert into Vaishnavism. An alternative interpretation is that making dedications to foreign gods was only a logical practice for the Greeks, intended to appropriate their local power and cannot be regarded as a "conversion" to Hinduism.

== Location and surveys ==
=== Survey by Alexander Cunningham in 1874–1875 ===
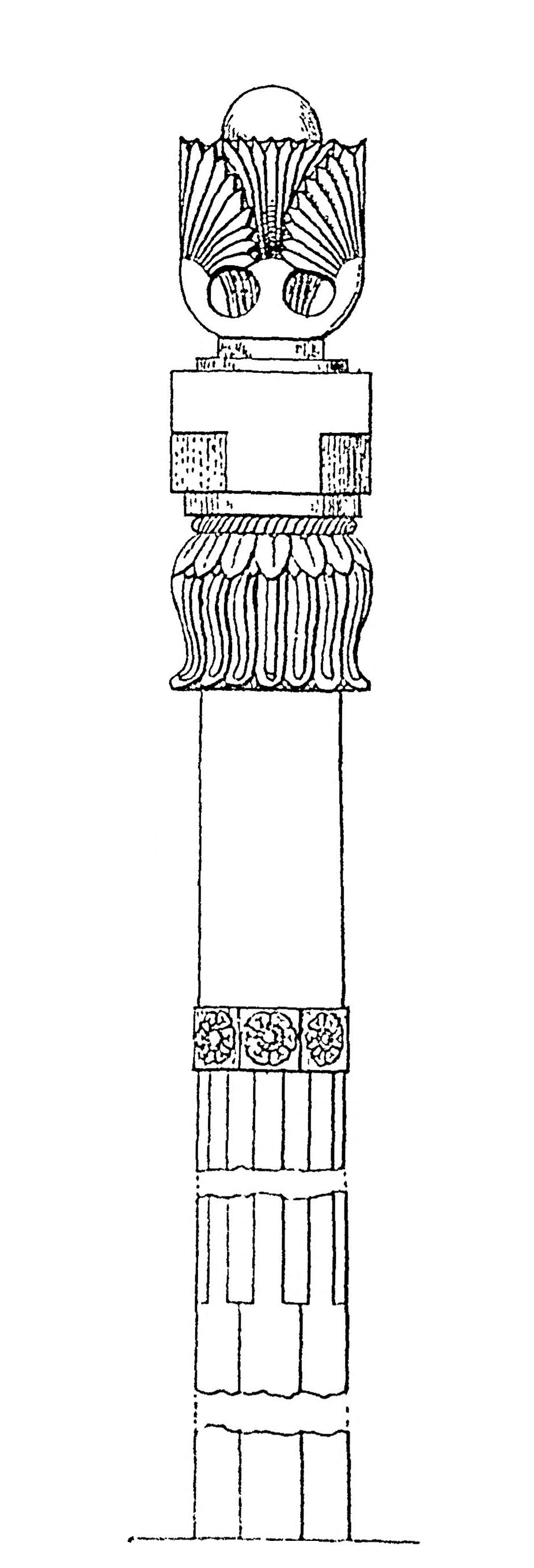
Initial reconstitution of the Heliodorus pillar by Cunningham in 1874–1875

The pillar was first discovered by Alexander Cunningham in 1877 near the ancient city of Besnagar in neighbourhood of Vidisha in central India. Besnagar was founded near the confluence of Betwa River and Halali River (formerly, Bais River and the basis for "Bes"-nagar). The fertile region was historically important because it was on the trade route between the northern Gangetic valley, the Deccan and the South Indian kingdoms of the subcontinent. The Besnagar site is at the northeastern periphery of the confluence, and close to Sanchi and Udayagiri, both ancient and of significance to Buddhism and Hinduism.

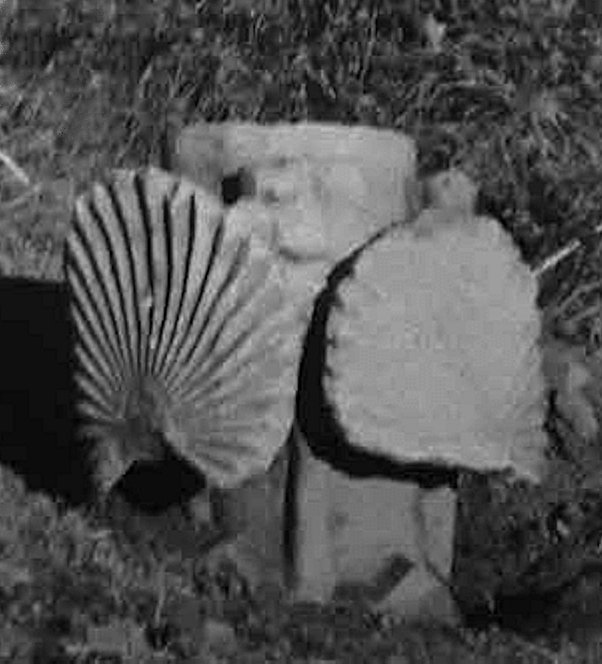
The fan-palm pinnacle Cunningham assumed belonged to the Heliodorus pillar.

When Cunningham first saw it, the pillar was thickly encrusted with ritually applied red paste (vermillion). This encrusted pillar was the object of worship and ritual animal sacrifice. Next to the red-colored pillar was a high soil mound, and on top of the mound a priest had built his home and surrounded it with a compound wall. The locals at the time called the pillar the Khamba Baba or Kham Baba.

Cunningham, an avid British archaeologist credited with many discoveries of ancient sites on the subcontinent, saw no inscription due to the thick crust surrounding the pillar. He nevertheless sensed its historical significance from the shape and the visible features such as the crowning emblem, carved fan, rosettes, the faceted symmetry merging into a round section. He also guessed there may be an inscription below the crust, and reported the pillar as, "the most curious and novel" of all his discoveries. Near the standing Besnagar pillar, Cunningham found the remains of a fan-palm pinnacle, which he thought originally belonged to the pillar. Assuming that this broken part was part of the standing pillar, he sketched a composite version. The fan-palm design is otherwise known to be associated to the worship of Samkarsana-Balarama, another one of the Vrishni heroes.

A short distance away, Cunningham found a second pillar capital on the ground with an emblem in the form of a makara (mythical elephant-crocodile-fish composite). He assumed, based on the shape of the bell, which he considered "of true Ashokan proportions", that this broken part was part of a lost pillar of the Ashokan period. Further, about a kilometer away, Cunningham found a third pillar capital of similar style, with an emblem in the form of a kalpadruma (wishing tree). Cunningham assumed this discovery too was related to the Besnagar pillar in some way. The kalpa tree design is otherwise known to be associated to the goddess Sri Lakshmi.

Later research showed that the fan palm pinnacle could not fit, and the discovery of the inscription on the pillar suggested that a Garuda emblem was crowning the structure.

=== Second survey in 1909–1910 ===
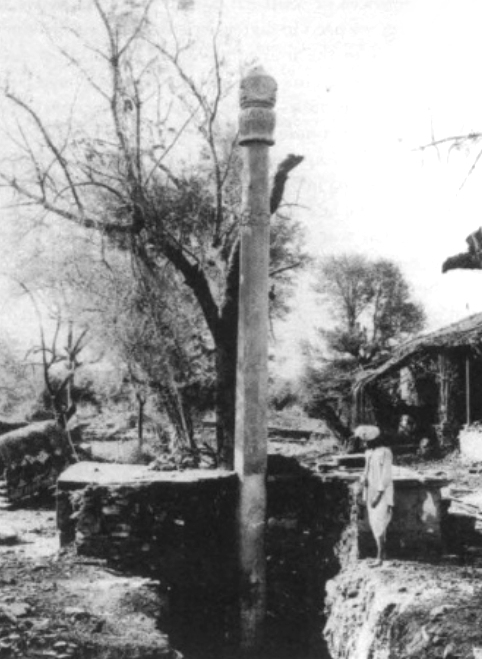
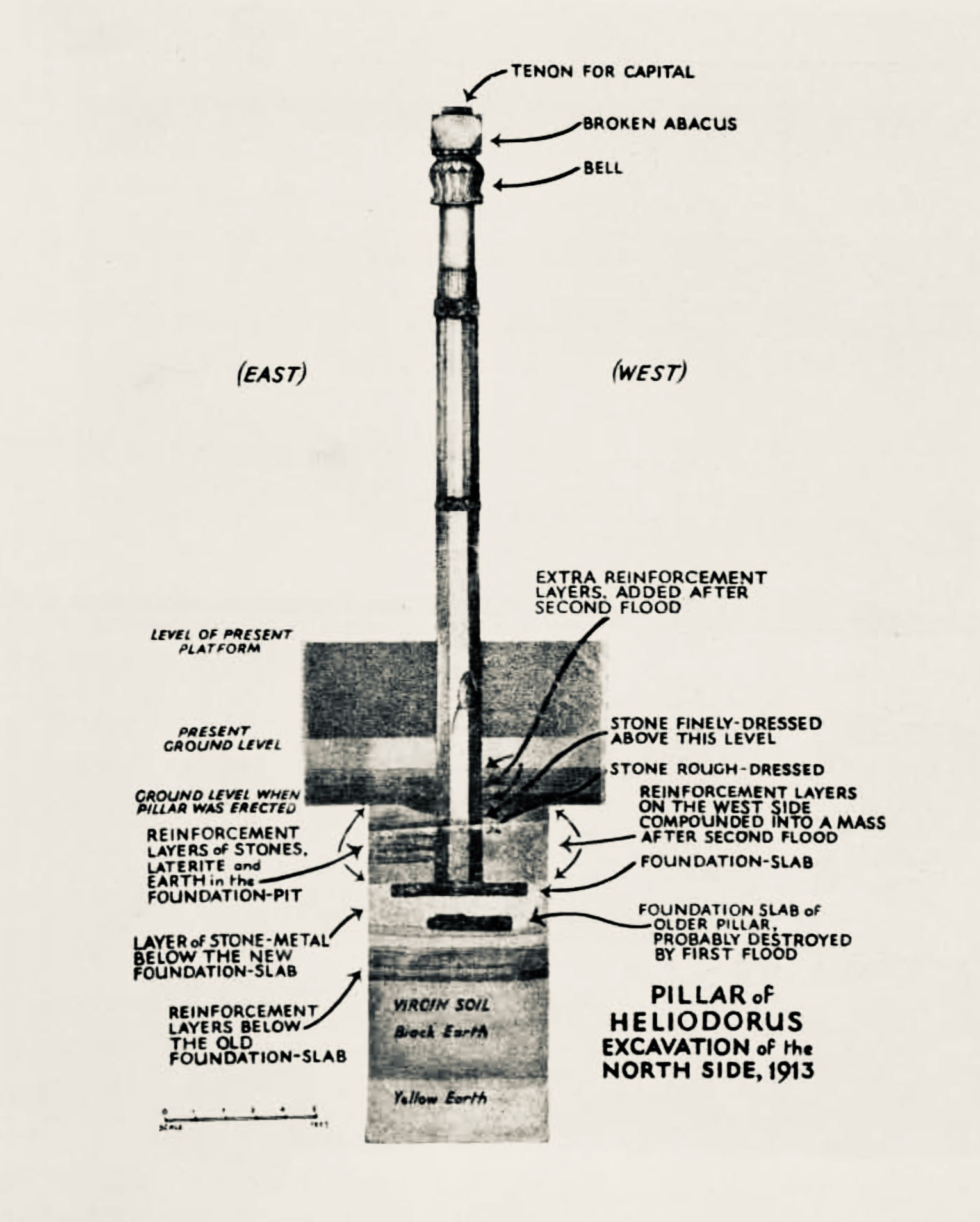
Heliodorus pillar, 1913–15 excavation, with sketch of cross-section.

Between 1909 and early 1910, nearly 30 years after the pillar's discovery, a small Indian and British archaeological team led by H H Lake revisited the site. After the thick red crust was cleaned out, they found Brahmi script inscriptions. John Marshall reported the discovered inscriptions, and to everyone's surprise, the longer inscription related to a Greek ambassador named Heliodorus of 2nd-century BCE and the deity Vāsudeva. An additional smaller inscription on the pillar listed human virtues, later identified to be from a verse of the Mahabharata.

=== Third survey in 1913–1915 ===
The pillar and the unusual inscriptions attracted two larger archaeological excavations. The first was completed between 1913 and 1915, under D.R. Bhandarkar, but left incomplete because the priest blocked efforts citing rights to his home and compound walls his ancestors had built over the mound.

The 1913–15 excavations, though partial, revealed that the modern era Besnagar site had experienced numerous floods that had deposited silt over the last 2,000 years. The partial dig uncovered an extensive rectangular, square and other substructure and many brick foundations aligned to the cardinal axes. More ruined parts, plates and capitals were also found. The relative alignments suggested that the Besnagar pillar was likely a part of a more extensive ancient site.

=== Fourth survey in 1963–1965 ===
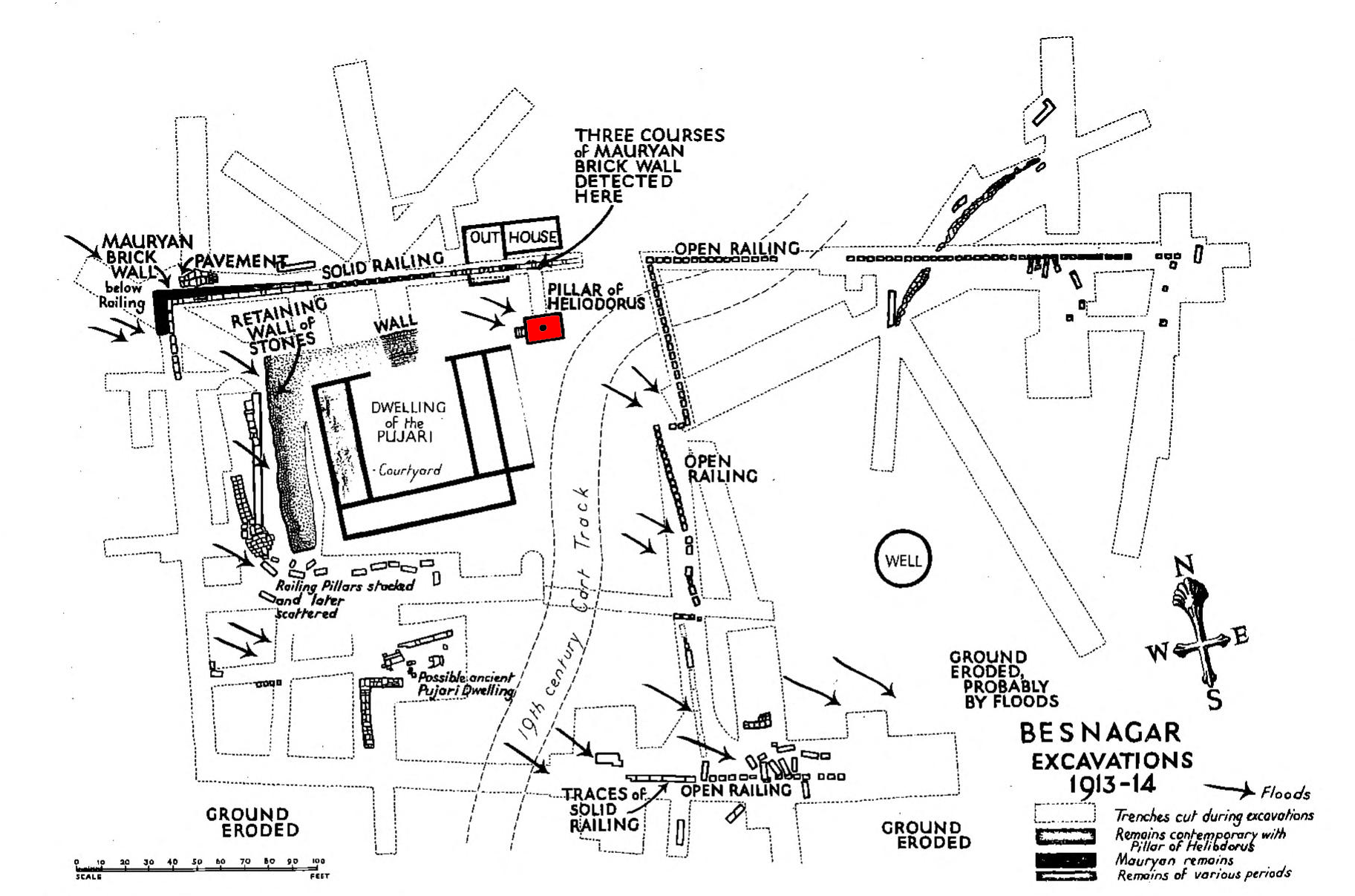
Map of the Besnagar excavations with location of the Heliodorus pillar ( ), created in 1913 by D.R. Bhandarkar

The next excavation was completed between 1963 and 1965, under Khare, who had convinced the locals to move their religious practice to a location near a tree close by and relocating the priest's family. The archaeologists for the second excavation had full access to the Besnagar pillar site.

The 1963–65 excavations revealed that the mound under the demolished later era priest home, contained the brick foundation for a sanctum (garbhagriha) and pillared halls (mandalas) of an elliptical temple. Further excavations below the foundation revealed a different foundation of likely a more ancient temple. These ancient temple foundation, layout and structures were similar to those discovered at Chittorgarh (Rajasthan). A more comprehensive excavation underneath the pillar and around the pillar led to the discovery that the pillar itself was much deeper, had a metal-stone interface, features Cunningham's early report had missed, and that secondary foundations were added over time to match the new ground level after major floods. Further, many more structures and items were discovered at the site. The archaeologists discovered that the Heliodorus pillar itself was one of eight pillars, all aligned along the north-south axis. These discoveries confirmed that the Besnagar Heliodorus pillar was a part of a more extensive ancient temple site.

== Pillar ==
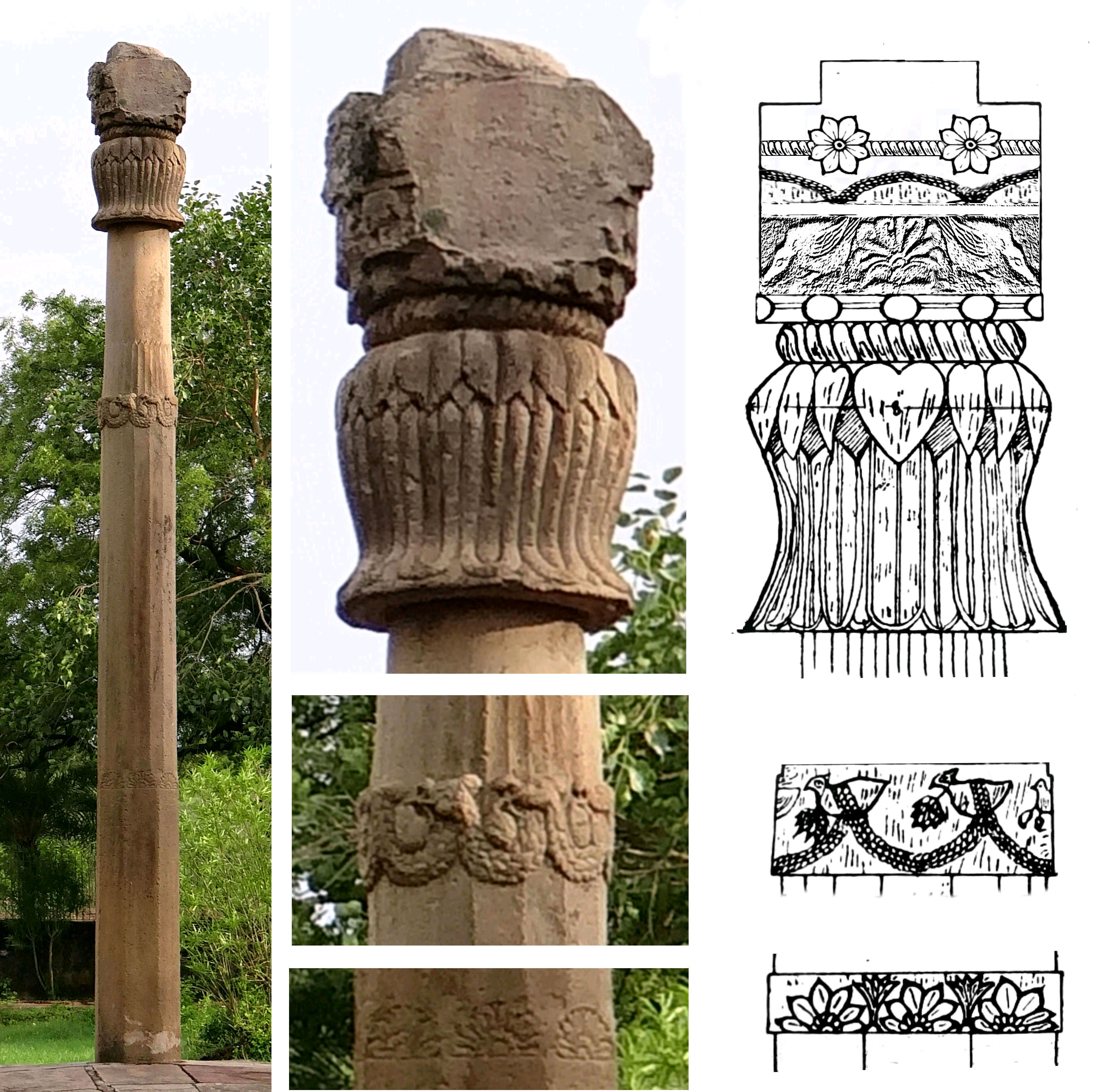
Structure and decorative elements of the Heliodorus pillar. The pillar originally supported a statue of Garuda, now lost, or possibly located in the Gujari Mahal Museum in Gwalior.

The 1913 excavation revealed that a significant part of the Heliodorus pillar is below the platform. It sits on top of the remains of a more ancient pillar probably damaged by floods. Over time, silt from various floods have deposited and a raised platform was added at some point. The pillar shaft has a base support of two placement stones held with a layer of stone-metal. Above this was an untrimmed stone portion of the pillar. Above the untrimmed section is a trimmed octagonal cross-section. The original ground level was about 4.5 centimeter above the junction of the untrimmed and trimmed section. Above the length with octagonal facet is the section of the pillar with sixteen facets. Above the sixteenths section is the thirty-two faceted section, beyond which is the short round pillar section all the way to the top where sat the crowning emblem (now missing). The pillar is about 17.7 feet above a square platform (12 feet side), and the platform itself is about 3 feet high above the ground. The currently visible portion of the pillar's octagonal section is about 4 feet 10 inches high. The sixteenths section is fully visible and is 6 feet 2 inches high. The thirty-twos is also fully visible and is about 11.5 inches high, while the round section is 2 feet and 2 inches high. The bell capital is about 1 feet 6 inches deep and 1 feet 8 inches wide. The abacus is a 1 feet 7 inch sided ornate square.

The ornamental bands on the pillar are at the junctions of the octagon-sixteenths and sixteenths-thirty-seconds sections. The lower ornamental band consists of half-rosettes, while the upper ornamental band is a festoon with birds (swag with flowers, leaves and hanging vines). Early scholars mistook it as geese (or swan), but a closer examination revealed that they are regular pigeon-like birds, not geese (nor swan). The upper festoon is about 6.5 inches long. According to Donald Stadtner, the capitals found at the Heliodorus pillar site are similar, yet different in ways from the Sunga capitals found at Sanchi. The Sanchi discoveries lack the clockwise birds, the makara and the band found in Besnagar. They have elephants and lions, which are absent in Besnagar. According to Julia Shaw, the elephants and lions motif is typically found with Buddhist art of this period. The two styles have differences yet informed the other, states Shaw.

The Heliodorus pillar is neither tapered nor polished like the ancient Ashokan pillars found in India. It is also about half the diameter of Ashoka pillars. The Brahmi inscriptions are found on the octagonal surface just below the lower ornamental band of half-rosettes.

The 1963–65 excavations suggest that the site had an elliptical shrine – possibly 4th to 3rd-century BCE – with a brick foundation and likely a wooden superstructure. This was destroyed by a flood around 200 BCE. New soil was then added and the ground level raised to build a new second temple to Vāsudeva, with a wooden pillar (Garuda dhvaja) in front of the east-facing elliptical shrine. This too was destroyed by floods sometime in the 2nd-century BCE. In late 2nd-century BCE, after some ground preparation, yet another Vāsudeva temple was rebuilt, this time with eight stone pillars aligned in the north-south cardinal axis. Only one of these eight pillars have survived: the Heliodorus pillar.

=== Inscriptions ===
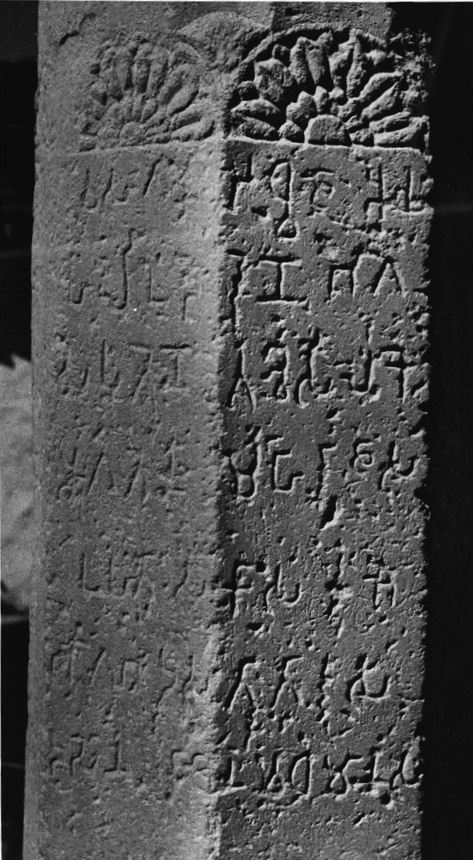
Main inscription of the Heliodorus pillar, c. 110 BCE.

There are two inscriptions on the pillar. The inscriptions have been analysed by several authors, such as E. J. Rapson, Sukthankar, Richard Salomon, and Shane Wallace.

The text of the inscriptions is in the Brahmi script of the Sunga period, the language is Monumental Prakrit, with a few Sanskritized spellings. The first inscription describes the private religious dedication of Heliodorus (Translations: Richard Salomon):

Line 1. This Garuda-standard of Vāsudeva, the god of gods
Line 2. was constructed here by Heliodora (Heliodoros), the Bhagavata,
Line 3. son of Dion, a man of Takhkhasila (Taxila),
Line 4. the Greek ambassador who came from the Great King
Line 5. Amtalikita (Antialkidas) to King
Line 6. Kasiputra Bhagabhadra, the Savior,
Line 7. prospering in (his) fourteenth regnal year.

The second inscription on the pillar, in the same script, recites a verse from the Hindu epic Mahabharata:

Line 1. (These?) three steps to immortality, when correctly followed,
Line 2. lead to heaven: control, generosity, and attention.

The identity of the King Bhagabhadra in the longer inscription is contested. Early scholars proposed that he may have been the 5th ruler of the Sunga dynasty, as described in some Puranic lists. However, later excavations by German archaeologists near Mathura (Sonkh) have shown that the Sunga dynasty may have ended before the Heliodorus pillar was installed. Therefore, it is probable that the Bhagabhadra may have been a local ruler. The virtues in the shorter inscription has been variously translated by different scholars. John Irwin, for example, translates it as "Restraint, Renunciation and Rectitude".

Heliodorus pillar inscriptions
Translation
(English)

This Garuda-standard of Vāsudeva, the God of Gods
was erected here by the devotee Heliodoros,
the son of Dion, a man of Taxila,
sent by the Great Yona King Antialkidas, as ambassador
to King Kasiputra Bhagabhadra,
the Savior son of the princess from Varanasi,
in the fourteenth year of his reign.

Three immortal precepts (footsteps)... when practiced
lead to heaven: self-restraint, charity, consciousness

Transliteration
(original Brahmi script)

𑀤𑁂𑀯𑀤𑁂𑀯𑀲 𑀯𑀸(𑀲𑀼𑀤𑁂)𑀯𑀲 𑀕𑀭𑀼𑀟𑀥𑁆𑀯𑀚𑁄 𑀅𑀬𑀁
Devadevasa Vā[sude]vasa Garuḍadhvaje ayaṃ
𑀓𑀭𑀺𑀢𑁄 𑀇(𑀅) 𑀳𑁂𑀮𑀺𑀉𑁄𑀤𑁄𑀭𑁂𑀡 𑀪𑀸𑀕
karito i[a] Heliodoreṇa bhāga-
𑀯𑀢𑁂𑀦 𑀤𑀺𑀬𑀲 𑀧𑀼𑀢𑁆𑀭𑁂𑀡 𑀢𑀔𑁆𑀔𑀲𑀺𑀮𑀸𑀓𑁂𑀦
vatena Diyasa putreṇa Takhkhasilākena
𑀬𑁄𑀦𑀤𑀢𑁂𑀦 𑀅𑀕𑀢𑁂𑀦 𑀫𑀳𑀸𑀭𑀸𑀚𑀲
Yonadatena agatena mahārājasa
𑀅𑀁𑀢𑀮𑀺𑀓𑀺𑀢𑀲 𑀉𑀧𑀁𑀢𑀸 𑀲𑀁𑀓𑀸𑀲𑀁𑀭𑀜𑁄
Aṃtalikitasa upa[ṃ]tā samkāsam-raño
𑀓𑀸𑀲𑀻𑀧𑀼𑀢𑁆𑀭𑀲 𑀪𑀸𑀕𑀪𑀤𑁆𑀭𑀲 𑀢𑁆𑀭𑀸𑀢𑀸𑀭𑀲
Kāsīput[r]asa [Bh]āgabhadrasa trātārasa
𑀯𑀲𑁂𑀦 (𑀘𑀢𑀼)𑀤𑀲𑁂𑀁𑀦 𑀭𑀸𑀚𑁂𑀦 𑀯𑀥𑀫𑀸𑀦𑀲
vasena [chatu]daseṃna rājena vadhamānasa

𑀢𑁆𑀭𑀺𑀦𑀺 𑀅𑀫𑀼𑀢𑁋𑀧𑀸𑀤𑀸𑀦𑀺 (𑀇𑀫𑁂) (𑀲𑀼)𑀅𑀦𑀼𑀣𑀺𑀢𑀸𑀦𑀺
Trini amuta𑁋pādāni (i me) (su)anuthitāni
𑀦𑁂𑀬𑀁𑀢𑀺 𑀲𑁆𑀯(𑀕𑀁) 𑀤𑀫 𑀘𑀸𑀕 𑀅𑀧𑁆𑀭𑀫𑀸𑀤
neyamti sva(gam) dama cāga apramāda

— Adapted from transliterations by E. J. Rapson, Sukthankar, Richard Salomon, and Shane Wallace.

Inscription
(Monumental Prakrit in the Brahmi script)

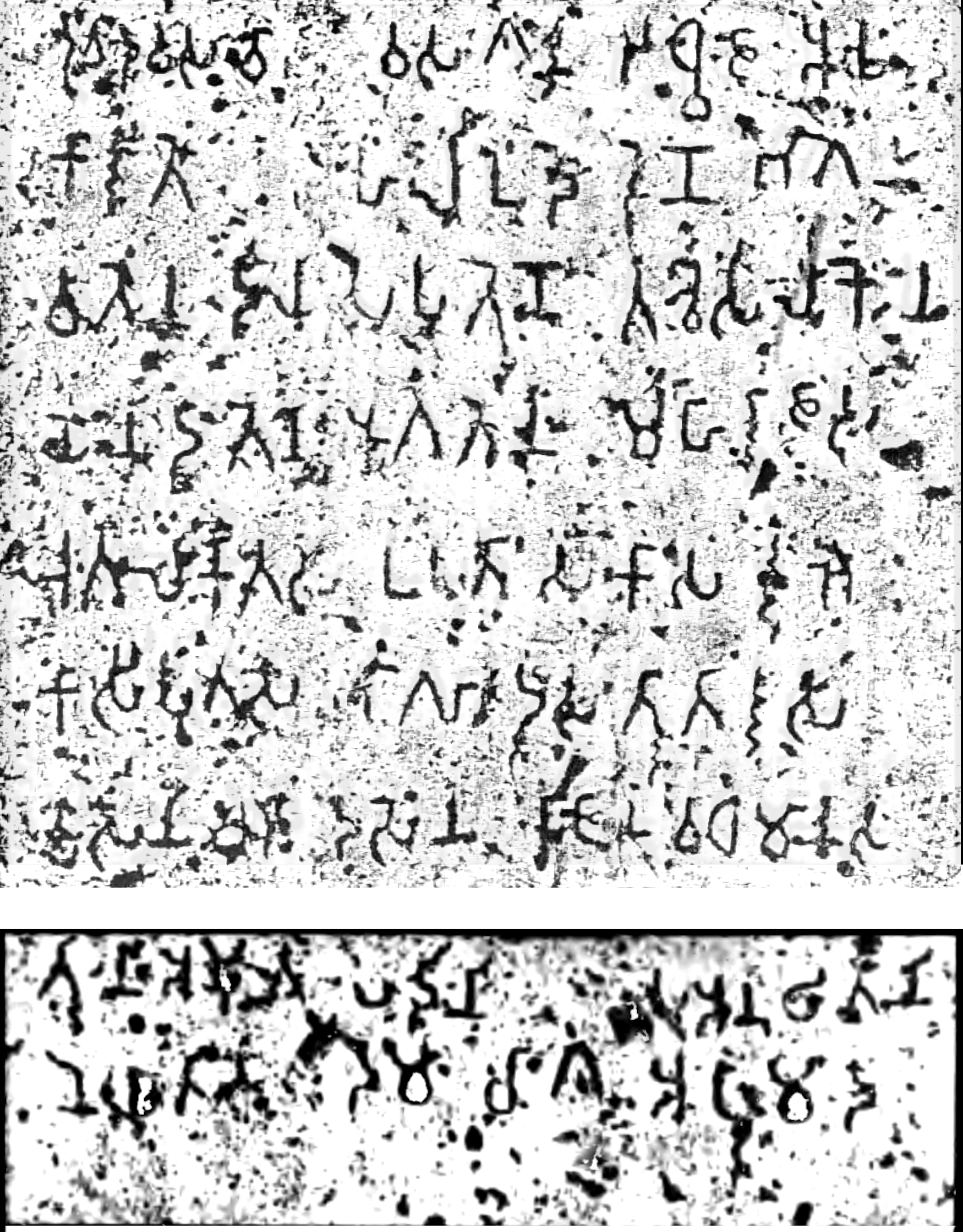
Heliodorus pillar rubbing (inverted colors). The text is in the Brahmi script of the Sunga period. For a recent photograph.

=== Garuda capital ===
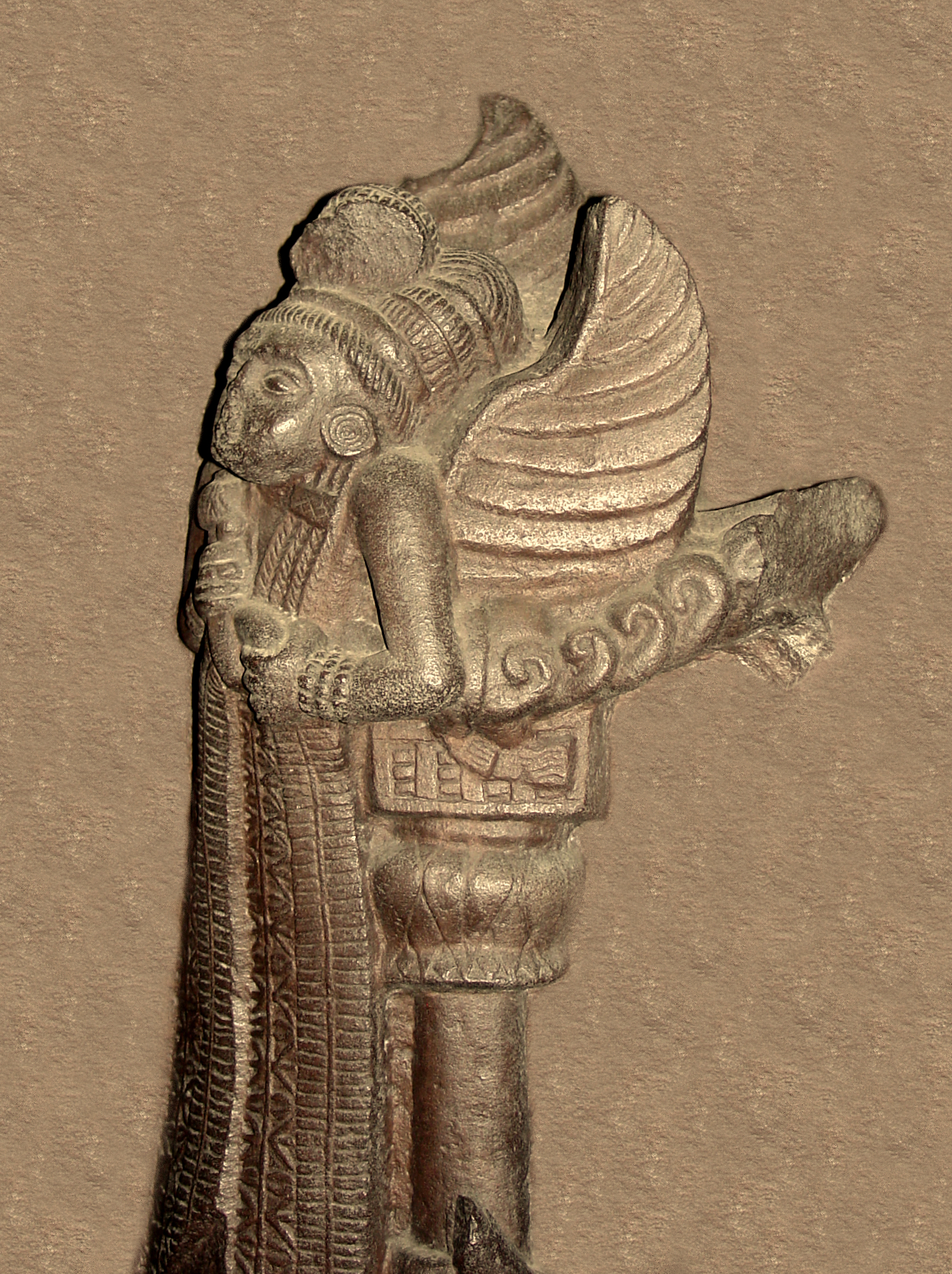
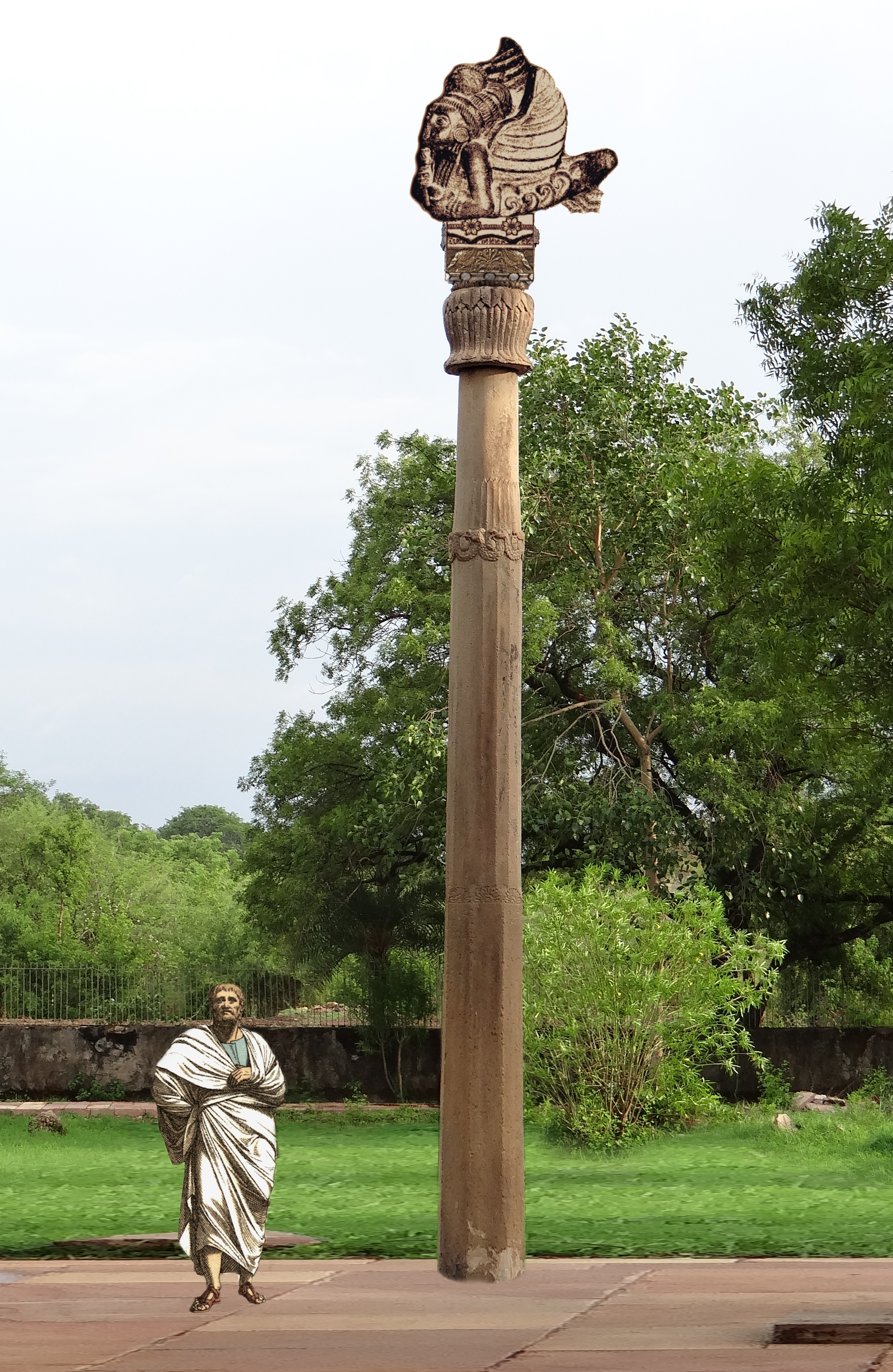
According to Huntington, the 100 BCE relief depicting a portable Garuda pillar in Bharhut (left), may have been similar to the Garuda capital of the Heliodorus pillar (right, illustration).

The Garuda capital of the Heliodorus pillar has not been found in the surveys, but it has been suggested that it had already been excavated by Cunningham, who was unaware of the Garuda attribution of the pillar, and that the remains of this Garuda capital were transferred to the Gwalior Museum together with the other artefacts initially discovered at the site. In particular, a statue fragment in the Gwalior Museum, composed of bird's feet holding a Naga, with the tail end resting on a portion of a vedika, may correspond to the lost Garuda capital of the Heliodorus pillar.

According to Susan L. Huntington, the Garuda capital on the Heliodorus pillar was probably similar to a portable Garuda standard illustrated on one of the nearly contemporary reliefs at Bharhut. In Bharhut, a man riding a horse is seen holding a portable pillar-standard, crowned by a bird-man creature similar to a Kinnara. The same concept of Garuda pillar may have been adopted for the Heliodorus pillar. Further, the Bharhut relief was dedicated by an individual from Vidisha, the town where the Heliodorus pillar is located, as explained in the attached dedicatory inscription, which suggests that the Garuda capital in the Bharhut relief may just be an imitation of the one on the Heliodorus pillar. The inscription in Brahmi script next to the relief of the Garuda pillar at Bharhut reads:

𑀯𑁂𑀤𑀺𑀲𑀸 𑀘𑀸𑀧𑀤𑁂𑀯𑀸𑀬𑀸 𑀭𑁂𑀯𑀢𑀺𑀫𑀺𑀢𑀪𑀸𑀭𑀺𑀬𑀸𑀬 𑀧𑀣𑀫𑀣𑀪𑁄 𑀤𑀸𑀦𑀁
Vedisā Chāpadevāyā Revatimitabhāriyāya pathamathabho dānam

"The first pillar (is) the gift of Chāpadevāyā, the wife of Revatimita, from Vedisa"

— Bharhut inscription A34, on the corner pillar of the railing of the Southeastern quadrant

==== Association with Garuda ====
The sun bird Garuda is the traditional vehicle of Vāsudeva. In the Mahabharata (probably compiled between the 3rd century BCE and the 3rd century CE), Garuda appears as the vehicle of Vishnu.

However, the understanding of Vāsudeva as an emanation of Vishnu probably appeared much later, as there is nothing to suggest it in the early evidence: the worship of Vāsudeva between the 4th century BCE and the 2nd century BCE was a warrior-hero worship, after which the progressive amalgamation with Vishnu and Narayana would follow, developing during the Kushan period and culminating during the Gupta period.

Slightly later, the Nagari inscription also shows the association of the Hindu deity Narayana with Bhagavatism. Vishnu would much later become prominent in this construct, so that by the middle of the 5th century CE, during the Gupta period, the term Vaishnava would replace the term Bhagavata to describe the followers of this worship, and Vishnu would now be more popular than Vāsudeva.

==== Association with other Vrishni heroes ====
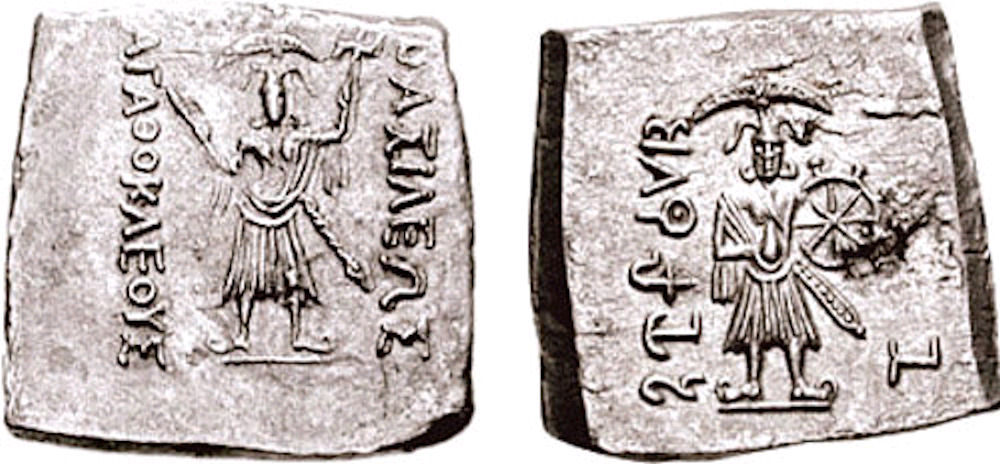
Images of the deities were probably present in shrines adjoining the pillars, in a style rather similar with their depiction on the coinage of Agathocles of Bactria (190–180 BCE). Here Saṃkarṣaṇa and Vāsudeva are shown with their attributes.

Other sculptures and pillar capitals were found near the Heliodorus pillar, and it is thought they were dedicated to Vāsudeva's kinsmen, otherwise known as the Vrishni heroes and objects of the Bhagavata worship. These are a tala (fan-palm capital), a makara (crocodile) capital, a banyan-tree capital, and a possible statue of the goddess Lakshmi, also associated with the Bhagavat worship. Just as Garuda is associated with Vāsudesa, the fan-palm capital is generally associated with Saṃkarṣaṇa, and the makara is associated with Pradyumna. The banyan-tree capital with ashtanidhis is associated with Lakshmi.

The presence of these pillar capitals, found near the Heliodorus pillar, suggests that the Bhagavata worship, although centered around the figures of Vāsudeva and Saṃkarṣaṇa, may also have involved the worship of other Vrishni deities, such as Pradyumna, son of Vāsudeva. For example, there may have been a Pradyumna temple at Besnagar, or at least the Pradyumna pillar with its Makara emblem may have been incorporated into the Vāsudeva shrine. In effect, the findings surrounding the Heliodorus pillar suggest the worship of a trio of the Vrishni heroes in this time and area, composed of the three deities Vāsudesa, Saṃkarṣaṇa and Pradyumna.

Excavations suggests that these various pillars with their symbolic capitals were standing in line at the site, and that the Heliodorus pillar was just one of them, standing at the northern end of the line. Although the pillars are aniconic, it is probable that now lost sculptures representing the deities, broadly similar to the depictions on Vāsudeva and Samkarshana on the coins of Agathocles of Bactria (190–180 BCE), were located in adjoining shrines. An inscription on an octagonal pillar found in nearby Besnagar does mention a "Garudadvaja" installed in a Temple of Vasudeva (Vasudeva prasadauttama) by a Gautamiputra Bhagavata, suggesting that there may have been two Garuda pillars, just as there were two fan-palm pillars, in front the Vāsudeva Temple.

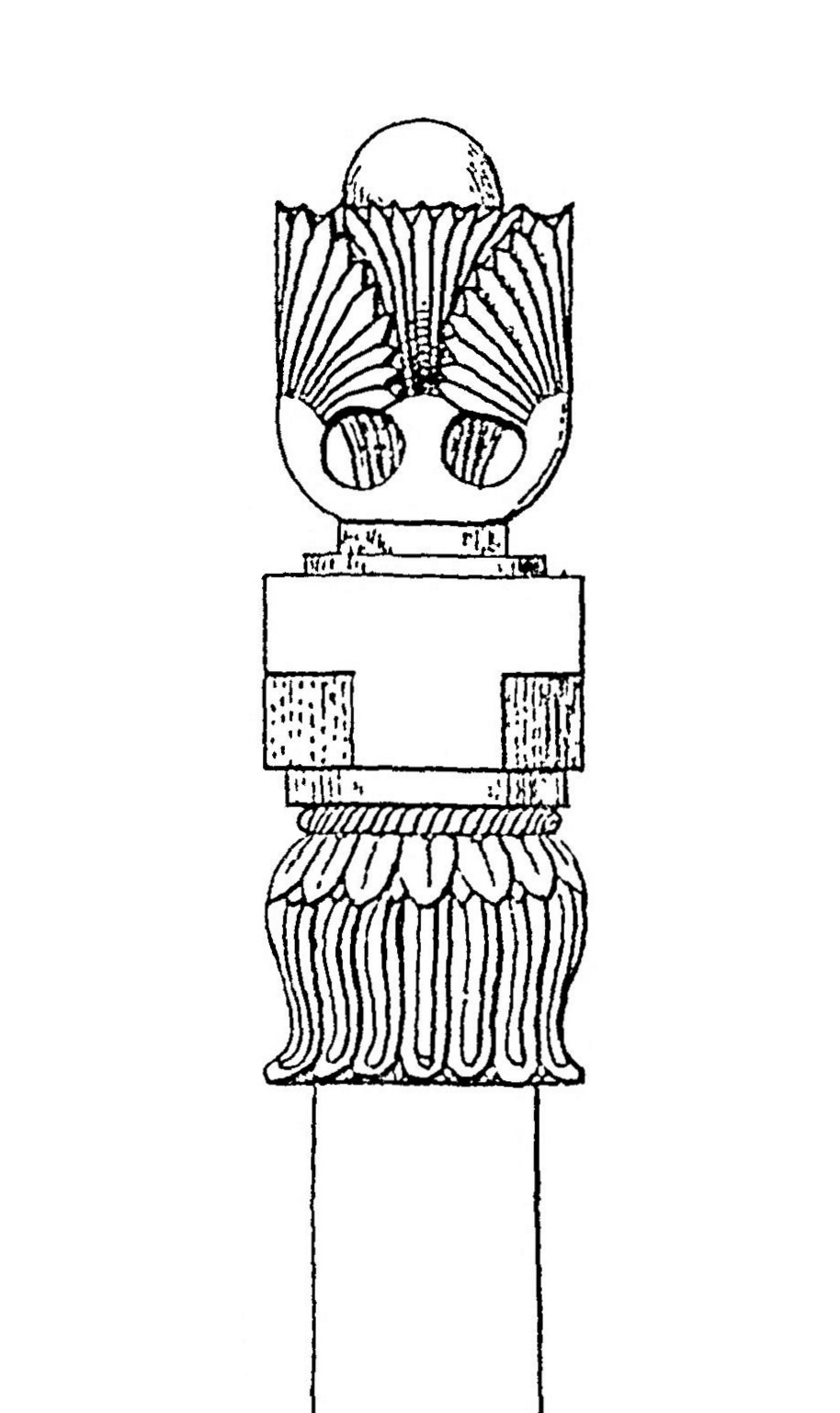
The fan-palm capital, found next to the Heliodorus pillar, is associated with Saṃkarṣaṇa.

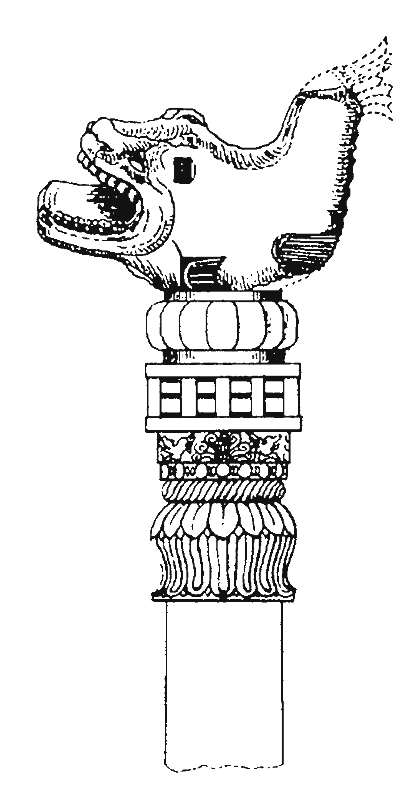
The Makara capital, found at the site of the Heliodorus pillar, is associated with Pradyumna. 2nd century BCE. Gwalior Museum.

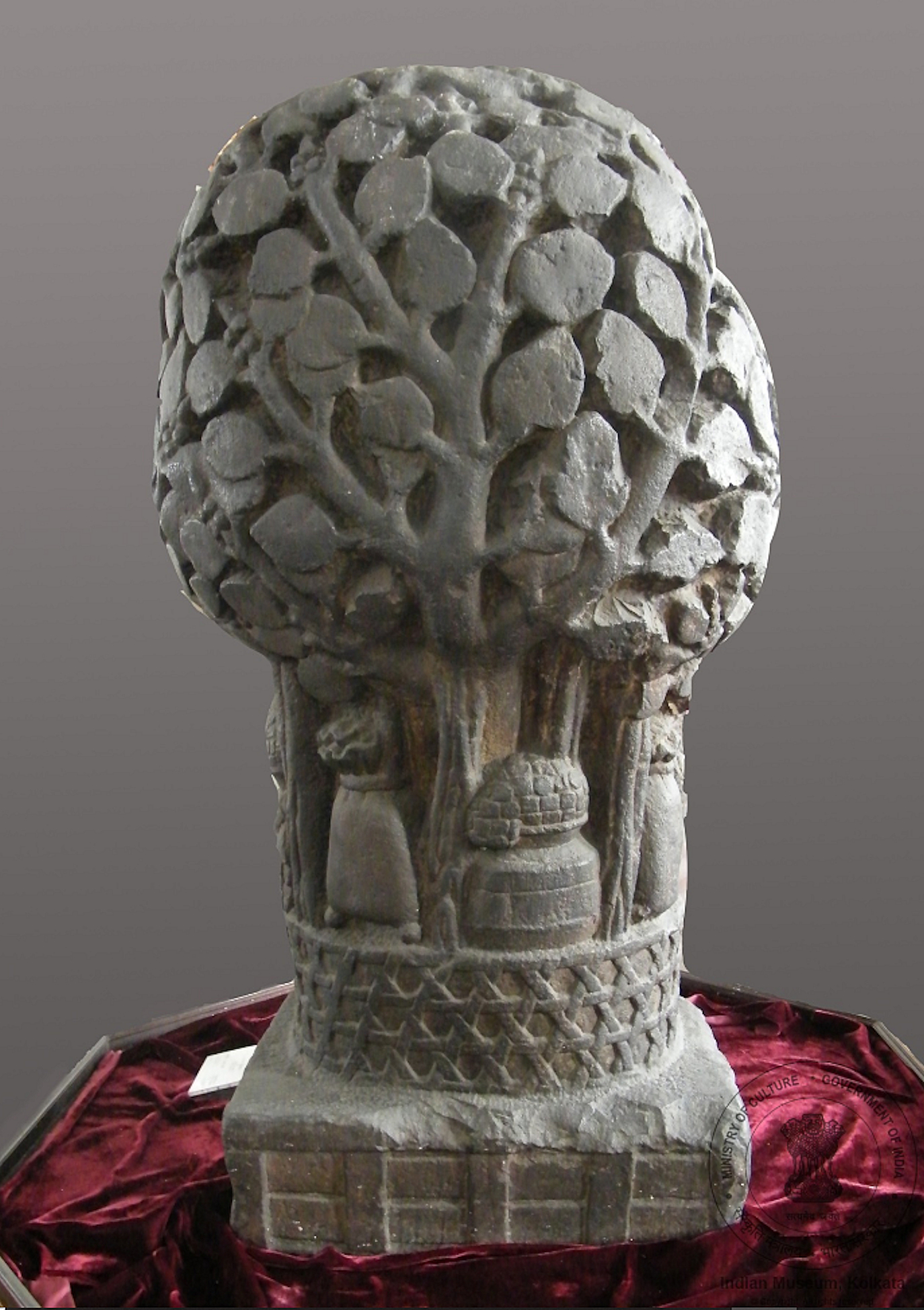
A pillar capital shaped as a Kalpadruma tree, also found nearby at Besnagar, probably associated with Lakshmi. Indian Museum, Kolkata.

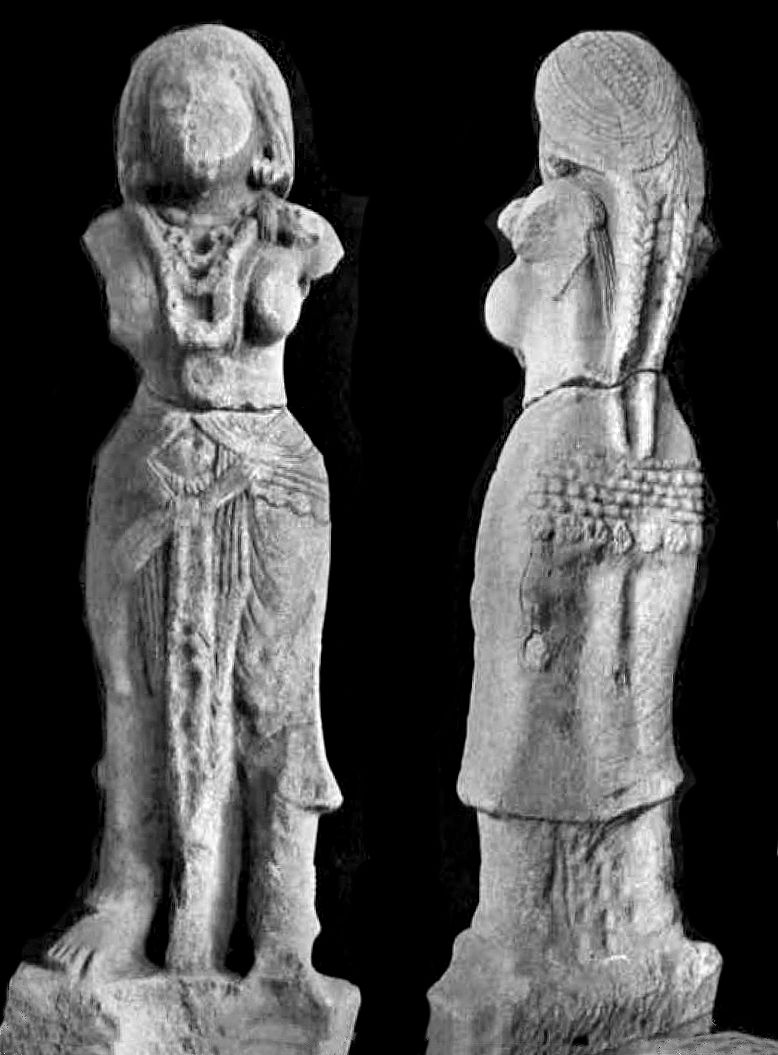
Possible statue of the goddess Lakshmi, also associated with the Bhagavat worship and discovered at Besnagar.

== Temple ==
In 1910, an archaeological team led by H H Lake revisited the Heliodorus pillar site and nearby mounds. They found the Brahmi inscriptions on the pillar, and noticed several mistakes in the early Cunningham report. They also found many other broken wall pieces, pillar sections and broken statues in different mounds along the river, within a kilometer from the pillar. Lake speculated these to be variously related to Buddhism, Hinduism and Jainism. Near the Heliodorus pillar site, his team discovered Sapta-Matrikas (seven mothers of the Shaktism tradition of Hinduism), dating to the 5th–6th century CE. These discoveries suggest that Besnagar was probably an important ancient temples and pilgrimage site.

Temple of Vāsudeva

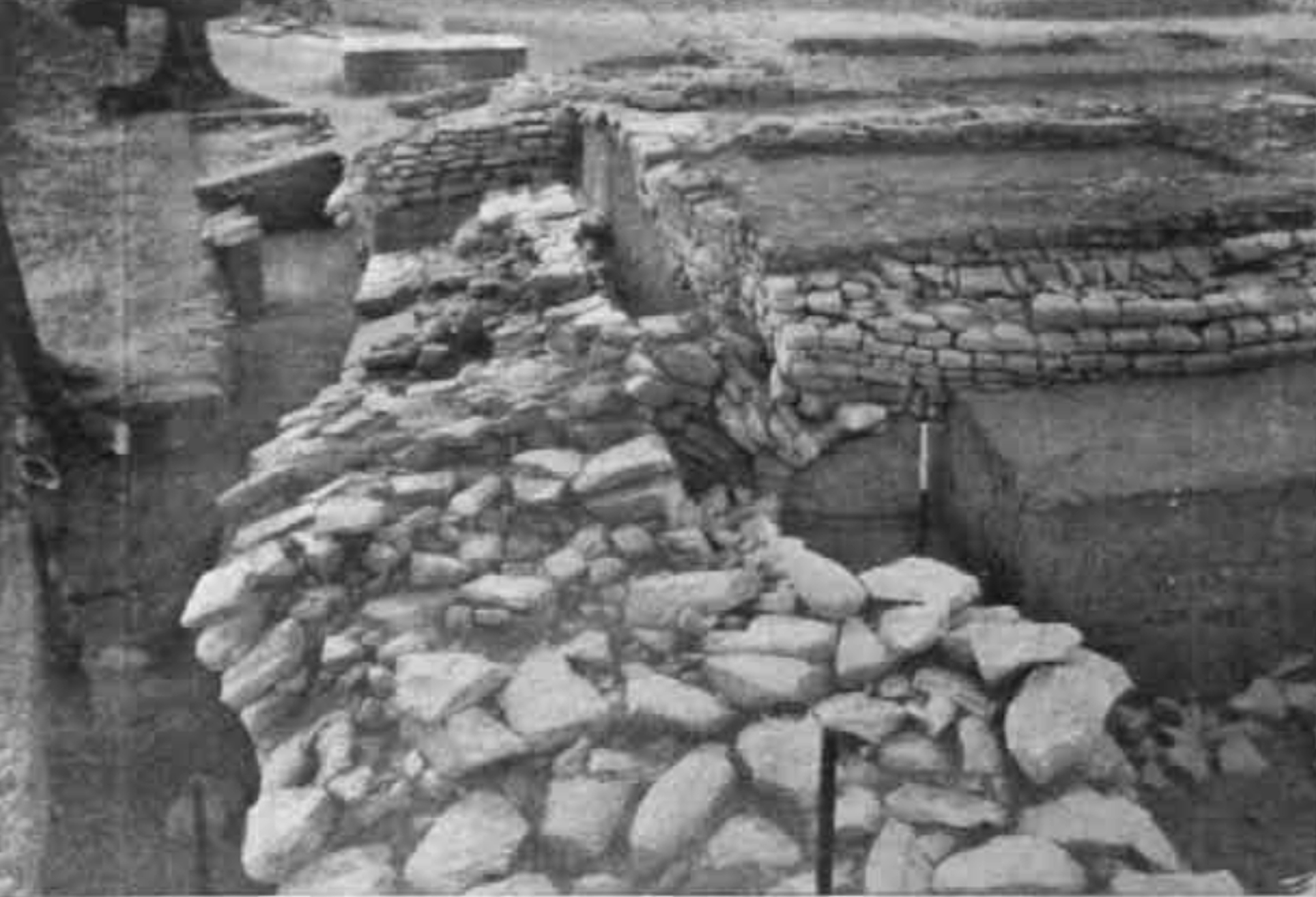
Initial excavations

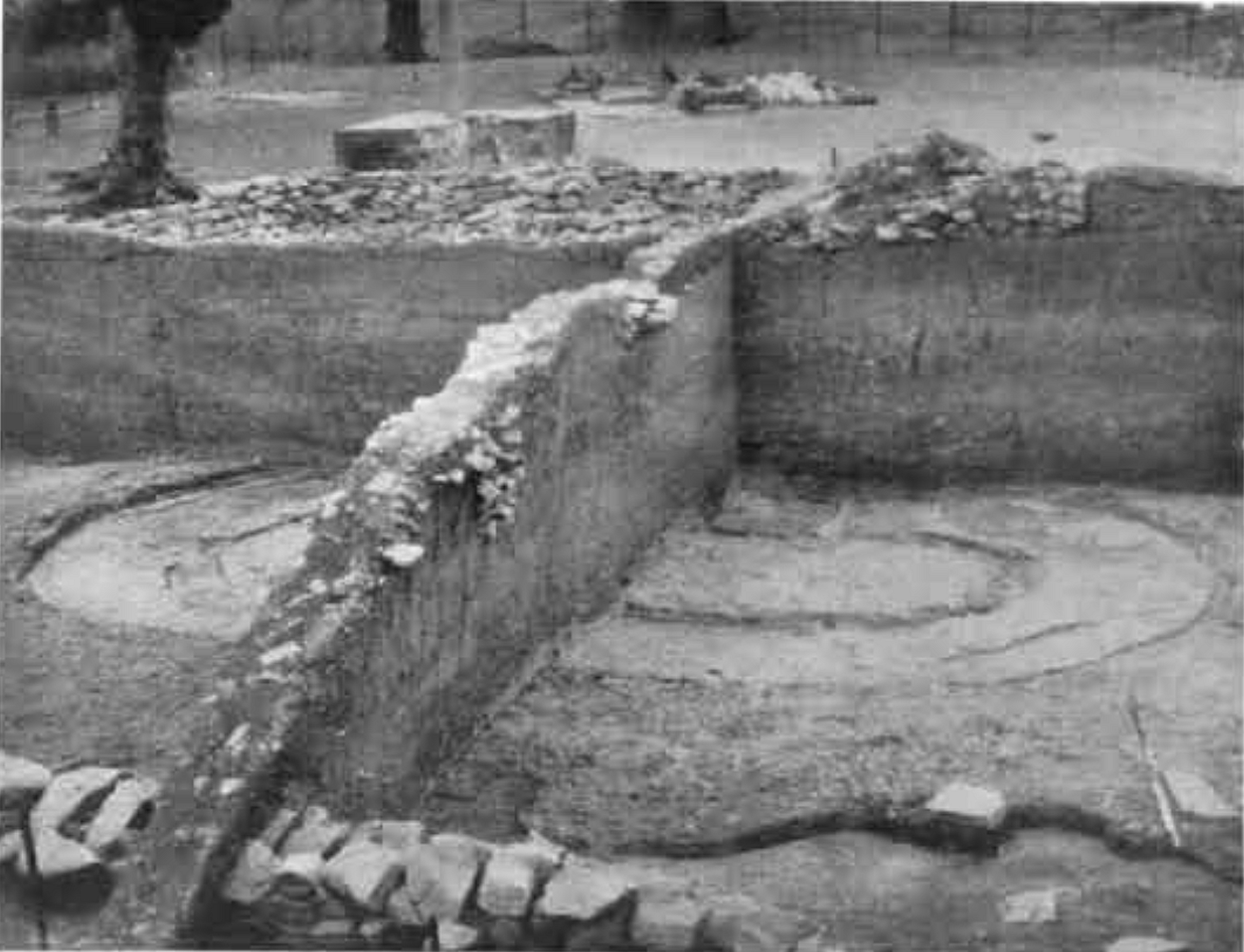
Elliptic plan of the Temple

Excavation of the huge Temple of Vāsudeva next to the Heliodorus pillar. The Temple measured 30x30 meters, and the walls were 2.4 meters thick. Pottery remains assigns the site to the 2nd century BCE. Further excavations also revealed the outline of a smaller elliptic temple structure, which was probably destroyed by the end of the 3rd century BCE. The platform and the base of the Heliodorus pillar are visible in the immediate background.

The 1963–65 excavations revealed that the Heliodorus pillar was a part of an ancient temple site. The archaeologists found an ancient elliptical foundation, extensive floor and plinth produced from burnt bricks. Further, the foundations for all the major components of a Hindu temple – garbhagriha (sanctum), pradakshinapatha (circumambulation passage), antarala (antechamber next to sanctum) and mandapa (gathering hall) – were found. These sections had a thick support base for their walls. These core temple remains cover an area of 30 x 30 m with 2.40 m. The sections had post-holes, which likely contained the wooden pillars for the temple superstructure above. In the soil were iron nails that likely held together the wooden pillars. According to Khare, the superstructure of the temple was likely made of wood, mud and other perishable materials.

The sub-surface structure discovered was nearly identical to the ancient temple complex discovered in Nagari (Chittorgarh, Rajasthan) – about 500 kilometers to the west of Vidisha, and the Nagari temple too has been dated to the second half of the 1st-millennium BCE. The archaeological discoveries about Vāsudeva Krishna at the Mathura site – about 500 kilometers to the north, states Khare, confirm that Garuda, Makara found at this site, palm-leaf motifs were related to early Vaishnavism. The Heliodorus pillar was a part of an ancient Vaishnava temple. According to Susan Mishra and Himanshu Ray, the Heliodorus pillar Besnagar site (2nd century BCE) and the Nagari site (1st century BCE) are perhaps the "earliest Hindu temples" that archaeologists have discovered.

== Archaeological characteristics and significance ==
The Heliodorus pillar, being dated rather precisely to the period of the reign of Antialkidas (approximately 115–80 BCE), is an essential marker of the evolution of Indian art during the Sunga period. It is, following the Pillars of Ashoka, the next pillar to be associated clearly with a datable inscription. The motifs on the pillar are key in dating some of the architectural elements of the nearby Buddhist complex of Sanchi. For example, the reliefs of Stupa No.2 in Sanchi are dated to the last quarter of the 2nd century BCE due to their similarity with architectural motifs on the Heliodorus pillar as well as similarities of the paleography of the inscriptions. A remaining fragment of the Garuda capital is located at the Gujari Mahal Museum in Gwalior.

=== Nature and evolution of Vāsudeva ===
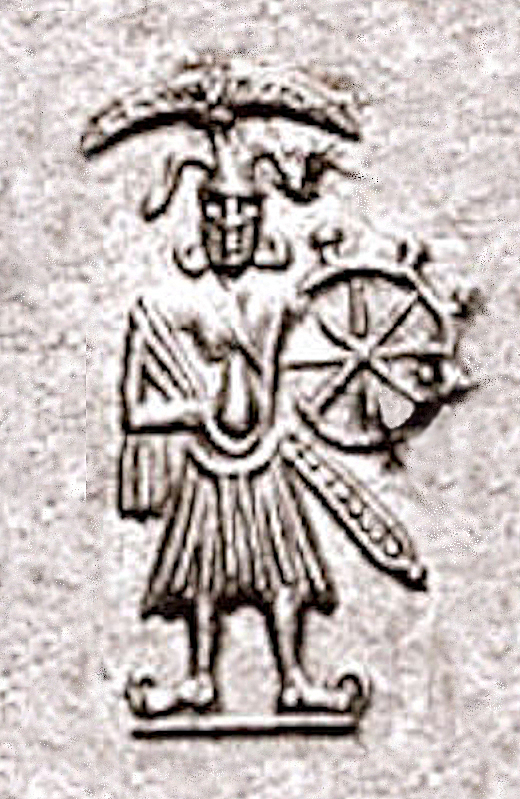
The deity to whom the Heliodorus pillar was dedicated: Vāsudeva, as depicted on a coin of Agathocles of Bactria, 190–180 BCE.

Vāsudeva refers to "Krishna, son of Vasudeva", "Vāsudeva" in the lengthened form being a vṛddhi-derivative of the short form Vasudeva, a type of formation very common in Sanskrit signifying "of, belonging to, descended from". The worship of Vāsudeva may have evolved from the worship of a historical figure belonging to the Vrishni clan in the region of Mathura. He is also known as a member of the five "Vrishni heroes". According to Upinder Singh "Vāsudeva-Krishna was the Indian God bearing the closest resemblance to the Greek God Herakles". He was also depicted on the coinage of Agathocles of Bactria c. 190-180 BCE, which shows that he was already widely considered as a deity by that time, and probably as early as the 4th century according to literary evidence. In the Heliodorus pillar, Vāsudeva-Krishna was worshipped as the "God of Gods", the Supreme Deity. At one point Vāsudeva-Krishna came to be associated to the God Narayana-Vishnu. Epigraphically, this association is confirmed by the Hathibada Ghosundi Inscriptions of the 1st century BCE. In the Heliodorus inscription, Vāsudeva is called Devadeva, and in the Hathibada Ghosandi inscriptions he is called Sarveśvara, which both together correspond with a verse from the Mahābhārata.

vāsudevonantaśaktiḥ sr̥ṣṭisaṁhārakārakaḥ |
sarveśvaro devadevaḥ paramātmā sanātanaḥ ||

— Mahābhārata, Bhīṣma Parva, śloka 4462

It is thought that "by the beginning of the Christian era, the worship of Vasudeva, Vishnu and Narayana amalgamated". As a third step, Vāsudeva-Krishna was incorporated into the Chatur-vyūha concept of successive emanations of the God Vishnu. By the 2nd century CE, the "avatara concept was in its infancy", and the depiction of Vishnu with his four emanations (the Chatur-vyūha) starts to become visible in art at the end of the Kushan period.

Based on Helliodorus pillar evidence it has been suggested that Heliodorus is one of the earliest Westerners on record to convert to Vaishnavism whose evidence has survived. But some scholars, most notably A. L. Basham and Thomas Hopkins, are of the opinion that Heliodorus was not the earliest Greek to convert to Bhagavata Krishnaism. Hopkins, chairman of the department of religious studies at Franklin and Marshall College, has said, "Heliodorus was presumably not the earliest Greek who was converted to Vaishnava devotional practices although he might have been the one to erect a column that is still extant. Certainly there were numerous others including the king who sent him as an ambassador." Professor Kunja Govinda Goswami of Calcutta University concludes that Heliodorus "was well acquainted with the texts dealing with the Bhagavata religion."

According to Indologist Edwin F. Bryant, Heliodorus converted to the Krishna religion during this period. This is evident from the column dedicated to Garuda, Vishnu's eagle carrier, which features an inscription where Heliodorus identifies himself as a devotee of Vasudeva Krishna. The fact that a prominent foreign envoy embraced the Krishna tradition in the first century BCE suggests that the tradition had established firm roots by then. Moreover, there are several other inscriptions prior to the Common Era, created by Indian sponsors of the Vasudeva Krishna tradition.

Alternatively, the dedication made by Heliodorus to Vāsudeva as supreme deity may simply have been a diplomatic gesture. This may also have been an instance of a typically Greek religious practice: according to Harry Falk, it was a logical and normal practice for Greeks to make dedications to foreign gods, as they were just interested in appropriating their power, and this natural Greek behaviour cannot be construed as a "conversion to Hinduism".

=== Alternative interpretation ===
According to Allan Dahlquist, an alternative interpretation of the inscription is possible. Shakyamuni Buddha too was called a Bhagavan, and Heliodorus originated from Taxila where Buddhism was strong. At the time of Dahlquist's 1962 publication, he stated there was no proof that a sect of Vishnu-Krishna devotees existed at that time in Taxila. Lastly, according to Dahlquist, there is no definite evidence that Vāsudeva should necessarily refer to Vishnu-Krishna. As god-of-the-god, Vāsudeva can well be associated with Indra, who had a key role in Buddhism, stated Dahlquist.

Later scholars have questioned Dahlquist's analysis and assumptions. Kuiper criticizes him for interpreting the dubious source of Megasthenes, ignoring all the "indications to the contrary", and dispute Dahlquist's treatment of the evidence. The Greek texts that describe ancient India, have numerous references that suggest the existence of Vishnu-Krishna before the time of Heliodorus. For example, there is little doubt that Methora in ancient Greek texts is same as Mathura, Sourasenoi as Shurasenas, Herakles of India is Hari-Krishna, Kleisobora is Krishna-pura. Similarly, early Buddhist sources provide evidence of Krishna worship, such as the Niddesa which somewhat derogatorily mentions both Vāsudeva and Baladeva (Note: The dating of Niddesa is a disputed topic. It ranges from the 4th century BCE to post Ashoka period, but no later than the 1st century BCE.) The Jataka tales too include a story about Krishna. Heliodorus converted to the Krishna religion when he was serving as an envoy. The Heliodorus pillar's inscription is generally dated to the late 2nd century BCE or about 100 BCE, is attributed to Heliodorus, as recording his devotion to the Vaishnava Vāsudeva sect.

=== Related evidence ===
During the Besnagar site excavations by archaeologists Lake and Bhandarkar, a number of additional inscriptions were found such as one in Vidisha. These also mention Vaishnava-related terms. In one of those inscriptions, is the mention of another Bhagavata installing a pillar of Garuda (vahana of Vishnu) at the "best temple of Bhagavat" after the king had ruled for twelve years.

A pillar from nearby Buddhist Sanchi, Pillar 25, is thought to be contemporary with the Heliodorus pillar, and is also dated to the 2nd century BCE.

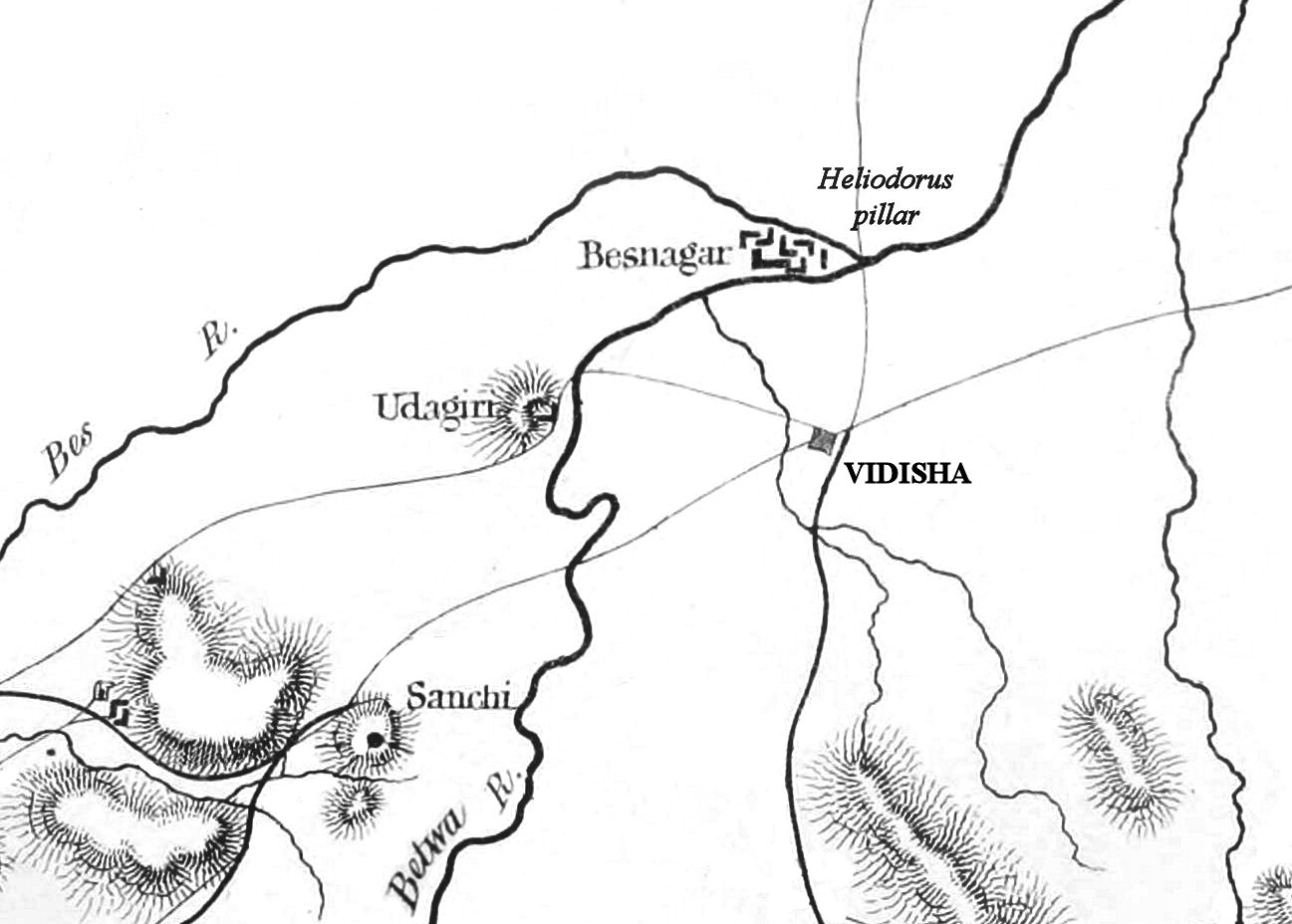
Location of the Heliodorus pillar in relation to Besnagar, Vidisha, Sanchi and the Udayagiri Caves.

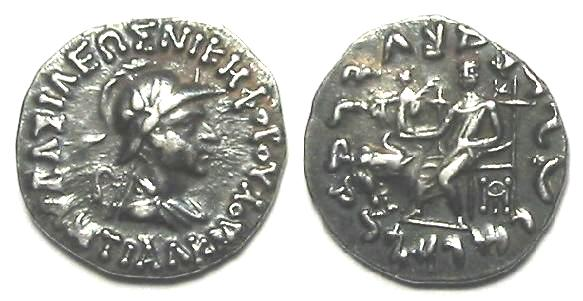
Heliodorus was the ambassador of king Antialcidas (here depicted on one of his coins).

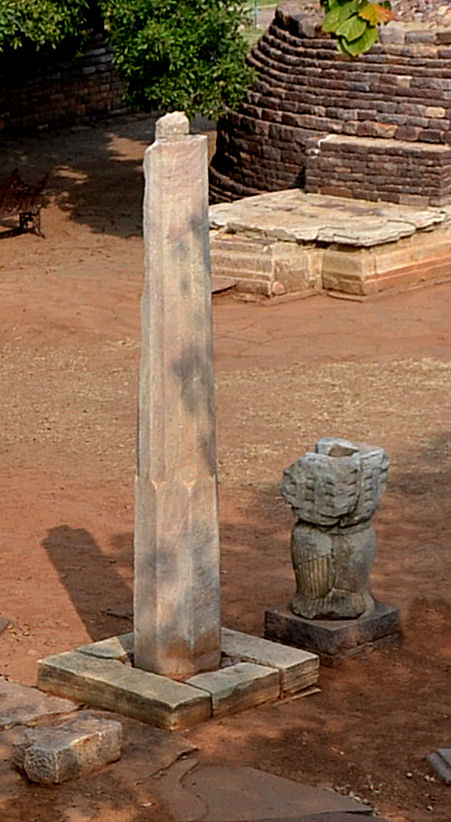
The contemporary pillar in nearby Sanchi.

== See also ==
- Bhagavata
- History of Hinduism
