= Bhagabhadra =

- Tratarasa; Kasiputra

Emperor of Magadha
- Reign: c. 114 – c. 83 BCE
- Predecessor: Vasumitra
- Successor: Devabhuti
- Dynasty: Shunga
- Religion: Hinduism

Bhagabhadra (Brāhmī: 𑀪𑀸𑀕𑀪𑀤𑁆𑀭 Bhā-ga-bha-dra, Bhāgabhadra) was a Shunga Emperor who reigned in northern and central India from around 114 BCE to 83 BCE. Although the capital of the Shungas was at Pataliputra, he was also known to have held court at Vidisha. It is thought that the name Bhagabhadra also appears in the regnal lists of the Shungas in the Puranic records, under the name Bhadraka, fifth ruler of the Shungas.

== Heliodorus inscription ==
He is best known from an inscription at the site of Vidisha in central India, the Heliodorus pillar, in which contacts with an embassy from the Indo-Greek King Antialcidas of Taxila is recorded, and where he is named Kasiputra Bhagabhadra, the Saviour, son of the princess from Benares":

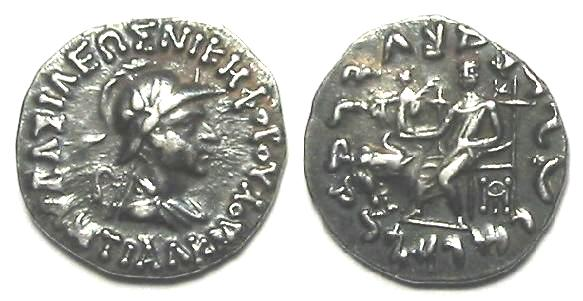
The Indo-Greek king Antialcidas was the one who sent an embassy to Bhagabhadra.

Devadevasa Va [sude]vasa Garudadhvajo ayam
karito i[a] Heliodorena bhaga-
vatena Diyasa putrena Takhasilakena
Yonadatena agatena maharajasa
Amtalikitasa upa[m]ta samkasam-rano
Kasiput[r]asa [Bh]agabhadrasa tratarasa
vasena [chatu]dasena rajena vadhamanasa

Translation:

This Garuda-standard of Vasudeva, the God of Gods was erected here by the devotee Heliodoros, the son of Dion, a man of Taxila, sent by the Great Greek (Yona) King Antialkidas, as ambassador to King Kasiputra Bhagabhadra, the Savior son of the princess from Benares, in the fourteenth year of his reign.

(Archaeological Survey of India, Annual Report (1908-1909))

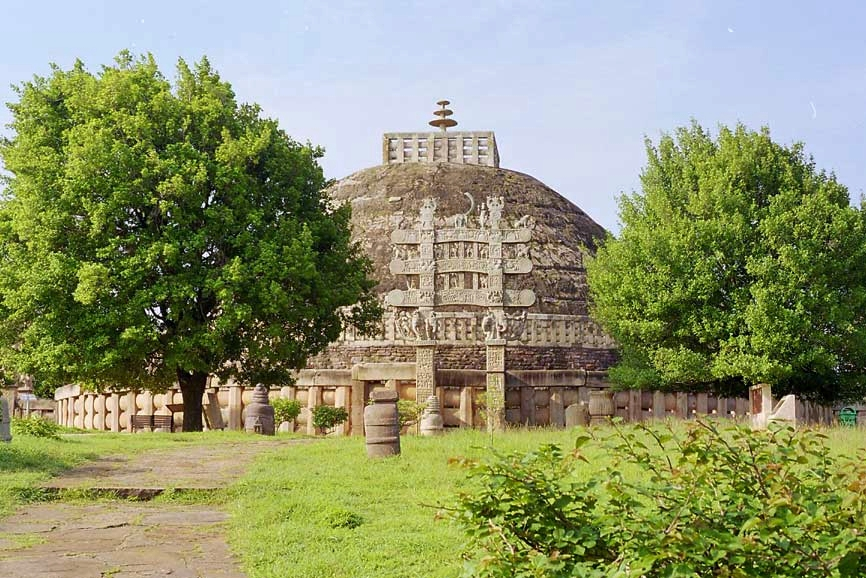
Some of the expansion work at the Great Stupa at Sanchi may have been sponsored by Bhagabhadra.

The Indo-Greeks and the Shungas seem to have reconciled and exchanged diplomatic missions around 113 BCE, as indicated by the Heliodorus pillar, which records the dispatch of a Greek ambassador named Heliodorus, from the court of the Indo-Greek king Antialcidas, to the court of the Shunga emperor Bhagabhadra at the site of Vidisha in central India. The text of the inscriptions is in the Brahmi script of the Sunga period, the language is Monumental Prakrit, with a few Sanskritized spellings. The first inscription describes the private religious dedication of Heliodorus (Translations: Richard Salomon):

Line 1. This Garuda-standard of Vāsudeva, the god of gods
Line 2. was constructed here by Heliodora (Heliodoros), the Bhagavata,
Line 3. son of Dion, a man of Takhkhasila (Taxila),
Line 4. the Greek ambassador who came from the Great King
Line 5. Amtalikita (Antialkidas) to King
Line 6. Kasiputra Bhagabhadra, the Savior,
Line 7. prospering in (his) fourteenth regnal year.

This inscription is important in that it tends to validate that the Shungas ruled in the area of Vidisa around 100 BCE. This is also corroborated by some artistic realization on the nearby Sanchi stupa thought to belong to the period of the Shungas. Altogether, three Shunga pillars have also been found in the area. The Garuda pillar erected by Heliodorous and the inscription written on this pillar is regarded as the earliest material evidence of Bhagavatism in India.

| Preceded by Ghosha or Vajramitra | Shunga Ruler circa 110 BCE | Succeeded by Devabhuti |
