= Antialcidas =

Antialcidas Nikephoros
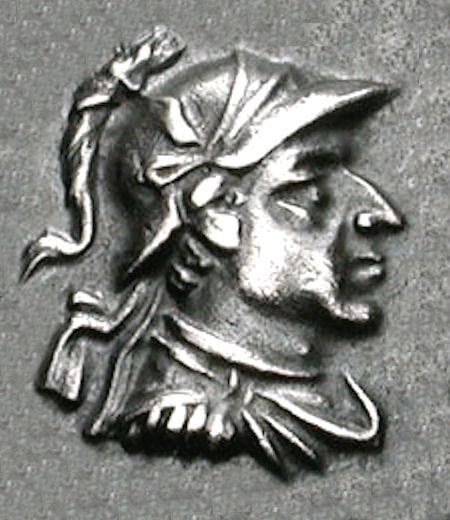
- Portrait of Antialcidas

Indo-Greek king
- Reign: 130–120 BC (R. C. Senior); 115–95 BC (Boppearachchi)

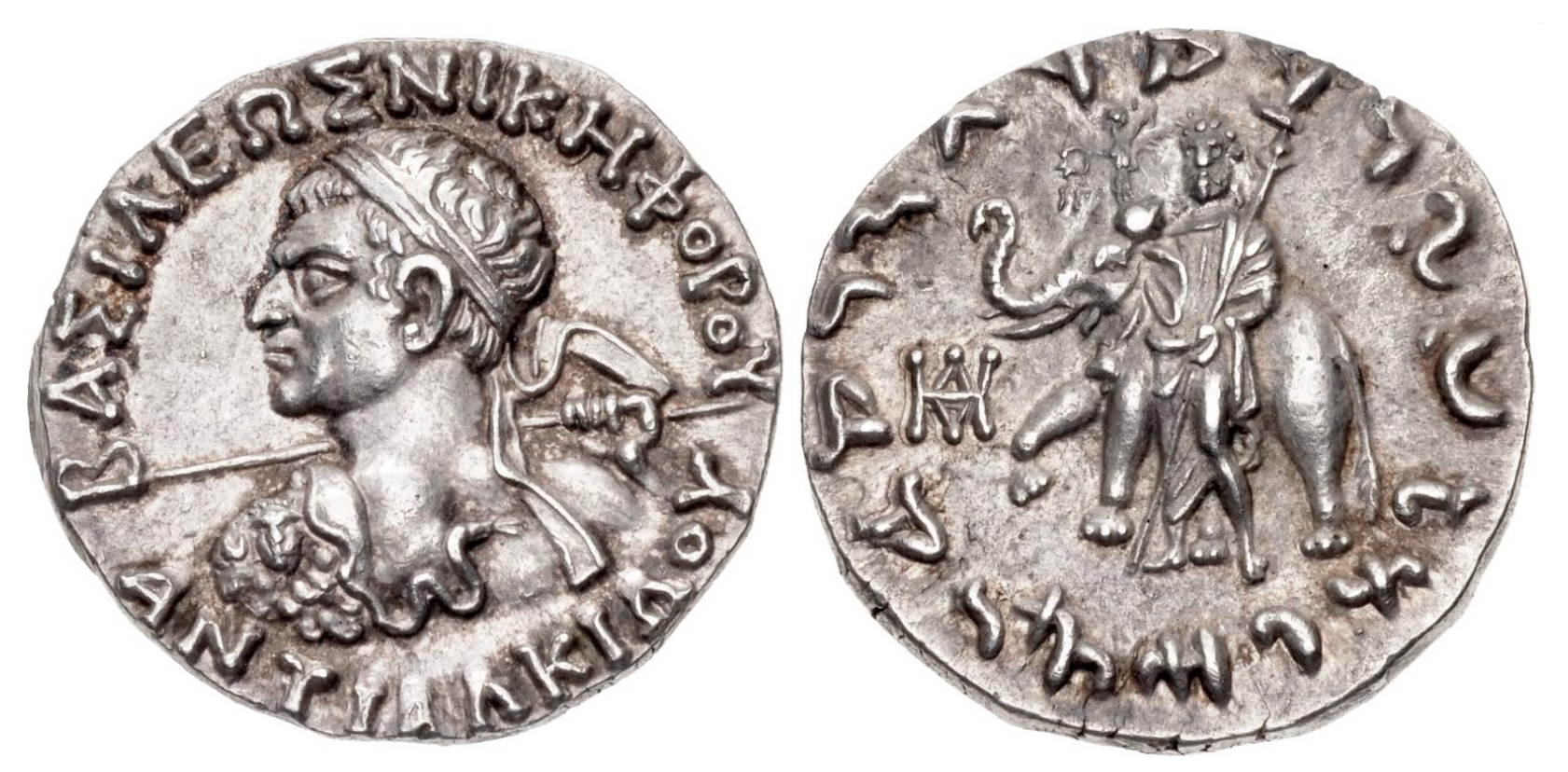
Silver tetradrachm of King Antialcidas. Obverse with the bust of Antialcidas wearing aegis and holding a spear, with Greek legend: ΒΑΣΙΛΕΩΣ ΝΙΚΗΦΟΡΟΥ ΑΝΤΙΑΛΚΙΔΟΥ "Of Victorious King Antialcidas". Reverse shows Zeus with lotus-tipped sceptre, in front of an elephant with a bell (symbol of Taxila), surmouted by Nike holding a wreath, crowning the elephant. Kharoshti legend: Maharajasa Jayadharasa Antialikitasa, "Of Victorious King Antialcidas". Pushkalavati mint.

Antialcidas Nikephoros (Ancient Greek: Ἀντιαλκίδας ὁ Νικηφόρος; epithet means "the Bearer of Victory" or "the Victorious", Brahmi: 𑀅𑀁𑀢𑀮𑀺𑀓𑀺𑀢𑀲 Aṃtalikitasa, in the Heliodorus Pillar) was a king of the Indo-Greek Kingdom, who reigned from his capital at Taxila. Bopearachchi has suggested that he ruled from ca. 115 to 95 BC in the western parts of the Indo-Greek realms, whereas R. C. Senior places him around 130 to 120 BC and also in eastern Punjab (which seems better supported by coin findings). Senior does however believe that he ruled in tandem with King Lysias.

== The Heliodorus inscription ==
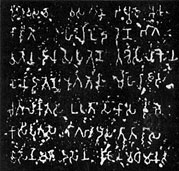
Inscription on the Heliodorus pillar made by Antialcidas' Ambassador named Heliodorus in 113 BCE.

Though there are few sources for the late Indo-Greek history, Antialcidas is known from an inscription left on a pillar (the Heliodorus pillar), which was erected by his ambassador Heliodorus at the court of the Shunga king Bhagabhadra at Vidisha, near Sanchi. It states that he was a devotee of Vishnu, the Hindu god.

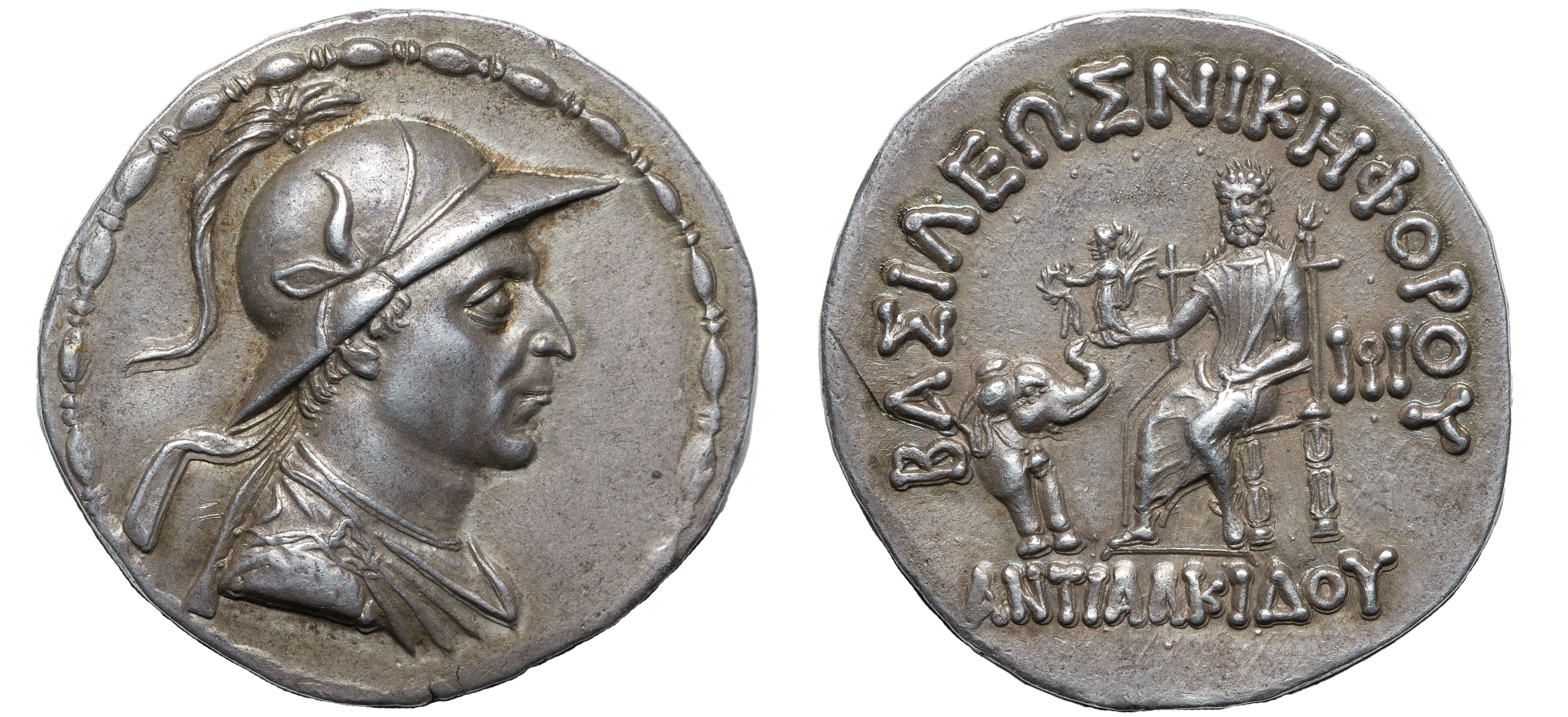
Silver coin of King Antialcidas in Attic weight. Obverse shows the King's portrait with Boeotian Helmet facing right. Reverse with Zeus Nikephoros, and Greek legend: ΒΑΣΙΛΕΩΣ ΝΙΚΗΦΟΡΟΥ ΑΝΤΙΑΛΚΙΔΟΥ, Basileōs Nikēphorou Antialkidou, "Of Victorious King Antialcidas".

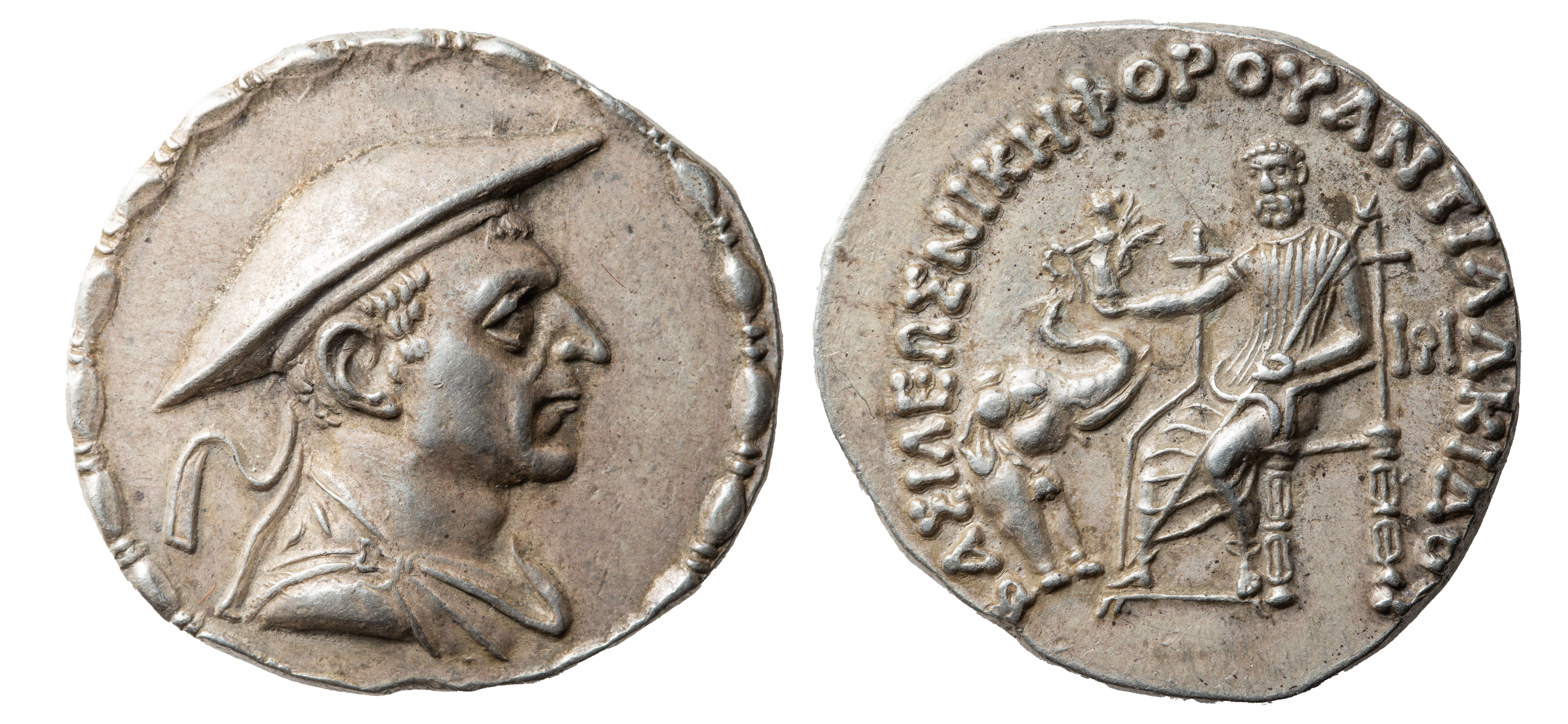
Silver coin of King Antialcidas in Attic weight. Obverse showing the King wearing a kausia and diadem. Reverse with Zeus Nikephoros, and Greek legend: ΒΑΣΙΛΕΩΣ ΝΙΚΗΦΟΡΟΥ ΑΝΤΙΑΛΚΙΔΟΥ, Basileōs Nikēphorou Antialkidou, "Of Victorious King Antialcidas".

A part of the inscription says:

"This Garuda-standard was made by order of the Bhagavata ... Heliodoros, the son of Dion, a man of Taxila, a Greek ambassador from King Antialkidas, to King Bhagabhadra, the son of the Princess from Benares, the saviour, while prospering in the fourteenth year of his reign."

The Indo-Greeks and the Shungas seem to have reconciled and exchanged diplomatic missions around 113 BCE, as indicated by the Heliodorus pillar, which records the dispatch of a Greek ambassador named Heliodorus, from the court of the Indo-Greek king Antialcidas, to the court of the Shunga emperor Bhagabhadra at the site of Vidisha in central India. The text of the inscriptions is in the Brahmi script of the Sunga period, the language is Monumental Prakrit, with a few Sanskritized spellings. The first inscription describes the private religious dedication of Heliodorus (Translations: Richard Salomon):

Line 1. This Garuda-standard of Vāsudeva, the god of gods
Line 2. was constructed here by Heliodora (Heliodoros), the Bhagavata,
Line 3. son of Dion, a man of Takhkhasila (Taxila),
Line 4. the Greek ambassador who came from the Great King
Line 5. Amtalikita (Antialkidas) to King
Line 6. Kasiputra Bhagabhadra, the Savior,
Line 7. prospering in (his) fourteenth regnal year.

Unsourced

== Gallery ==
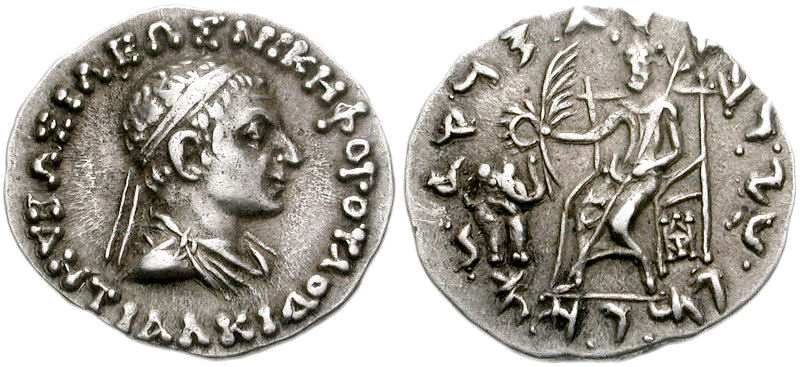
Antialcidas with Zeus directly giving wreath of victory to the elephant. With Greek legend: ΒΑΣΙΛΕΩΣ ΝΙΚΗΦΟΡΟΥ ΑΝΤΙΑΛΚΙΔΟΥ, Basileōs Nikēphorou Antialkidou, "Of Victorious King Antialcidas". Obverse with Kharoshti legend: Maharajasa Jayadharasa Antialikitasa.

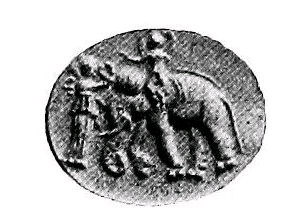
Gandhara seal of king on elephant receiving wreath of victory, a motif with some similarity to the coins of Antialcidas. The art is a mix of both Greek and Indian styles, which was characteristic of the region of Gandhara during the Hellenistic period.

== Sources ==
- The Shape of Ancient Thought. Comparative studies in Greek and Indian Philosophies by Thomas McEvilley (Allworth Press and the School of Visual Arts, 2002) ISBN 1-58115-203-5
- Buddhism in Central Asia by B. N. Puri (Motilal Banarsidass, January 1, 2000) ISBN 81-208-0372-8
- The Greeks in Bactria and India, W. W. Tarn, Cambridge University Press.
- The Indo-Greeks, A. K. Narain, B.R Publications
- The Decline of the Indo-Greeks, R. C. Senior & D. MacDonald, the Hellenistic Numismatic Society
- Richard Salomon (1998). Indian Epigraphy: A Guide to the Study of Inscriptions in Sanskrit, Prakrit, and the other Indo-Aryan Languages. Oxford University Press. ISBN 978-0-19-535666-3.

Preceded by Lysias	Indo-Greek king (in Paropamisadae, Arachosia, Gandhara); 115 – 95 BC	Succeeded by Polyxenios or Philoxenus

	Greco-Bactrian kings		Indo-Greek kings					
Territories/ dates	West Bactria	East Bactria	Paropamisade	Arachosia	Gandhara	Western Punjab	Eastern Punjab	Mathura
326-325 BCE	Campaigns of Alexander the Great in India						Nanda Empire	
312 BCE	Creation of the Seleucid Empire						Creation of the Maurya Empire	
305 BCE	Seleucid Empire after Mauryan war		Maurya Empire					
280 BCE	Foundation of Ai-Khanoum							
255–239 BCE	Independence of the Greco-Bactrian kingdom Diodotus I		Emperor Ashoka (268-232 BCE)					
239–223 BCE	Diodotus II							
230–200 BCE	Euthydemus I							
200–190 BCE	Demetrius I				Sunga Empire			
190-185 BCE	Euthydemus II							
190–180 BCE	Agathocles			Pantaleon				
185–170 BCE	Antimachus I							
180–160 BCE			Apollodotus I					
175–170 BCE	Demetrius II							
160–155 BCE			Antimachus II					
170–145 BCE	Eucratides I							
155–130 BCE	Yuezhi occupation, loss of Ai-Khanoum	Eucratides II; Plato; Heliocles I	Menander I					
130–120 BCE	Yuezhi occupation		Zoilus I		Agathoclea			Yavanarajya inscription
120–110 BCE			Lysias		Strato I			Yavanarajya inscription
110–100 BCE			Antialcidas		Heliocles II			Yavanarajya inscription
100 BCE			Polyxenus		Demetrius III			Yavanarajya inscription
100–95 BCE			Philoxenus					Yavanarajya inscription
95–90 BCE			Diomedes	Amyntas		Epander		Yavanarajya inscription
90 BCE			Theophilus	Peucolaus		Thraso		Yavanarajya inscription
90–85 BCE			Nicias	Menander II		Artemidorus		Yavanarajya inscription
90–70 BCE			Hermaeus	Archebius				Yavanarajya inscription
			Yuezhi occupation		Maues (Indo-Scythian)			
75–70 BCE				Vonones	Telephus	Apollodotus II		
65–55 BCE				Spalirises		Hippostratus	Dionysius	
55–35 BCE					Azes I (Indo-Scythians)		Zoilus II	
55–35 BCE					Vijayamitra/ Azilises		Apollophanes	
25 BCE – 10 CE				Gondophares	Zeionises	Kharahostes	Strato II; Strato III	
				Gondophares (Indo-Parthian)			Rajuvula (Indo-Scythian)	
			Kujula Kadphises (Kushan Empire)				Bhadayasa (Indo-Scythian)	Sodasa (Indo-Scythian)
