= Hybrid Sanskrit =

Hybrid Sanskrit may refer to

- Buddhist Hybrid Sanskrit (BHS)
- Epigraphical Hybrid Sanskrit (EHS)

== See also ==
- Sanskrit
- Prakrit
- Pali
