= Vasudeva Kanva =

Emperor of Magadha from 75 to 66 BCE

Emperor of Magadha
- Reign: c. 75 – c. 66 BCE (9 years)
- Predecessor: Devabhuti
- Successor: Bhumimitrac. 64 – c. 50 BCE (14year)
- Issue: Bhumimitra
- Dynasty: Kanva
- Religion: Hinduism

Vasudeva Kanva (c. 75 – c. 66 BCE) was the founder of the Kanva dynasty. He was originally an Amatya (minister) of last Shunga ruler Devabhuti. Vasudeva killed the last Shunga ruler and established Kanva dynasty. Bana's Harshacharita informs us that he came to power after the death of Devabhuti. He was succeeded by his son Bhumimitra.

== Ascension to power ==
He was originally an Amatya (minister) of last Shunga ruler Devabhuti. Vasudeva killed the last Shunga ruler and established Kanva dynasty. Bana's Harshacharita informs us that he came to power after the death of Devabhuti.

== Reign ==
He was a Vaishnavite (worshipper of Lord Vishnu). Most of the taxes collected during his reign were used for temples. He was one of the famous patrons of arts. During his reign, the Indo-Greeks invaded, but he managed to keep his throne. He was succeeded by his son Bhumimitra.

== See also ==
- Devabhuti
- Kanva Dynasty

Preceded by Devabhuti	Kanva dynasty c. 75 BCE	Succeeded by Bhumimitra
