= Gujari Mahal Archaeological Museum =

State museum in India

Coordinates: 26.234°N 78.170°E

The Gujari Mahal Archaeological Museum, also known as the State Archaeological Museum and sometimes called the Gwalior Fort Museum, is a state museum in Gwalior, nearby the Gwalior Fort. It was built by Tomar Rajput king Man Singh Tomar of Gwalior for his Gurjari wife, as she demanded a separate palace and refused to live with his other Rajput wives who looked down on her.

The Gujari Mahal Archaeological Museum
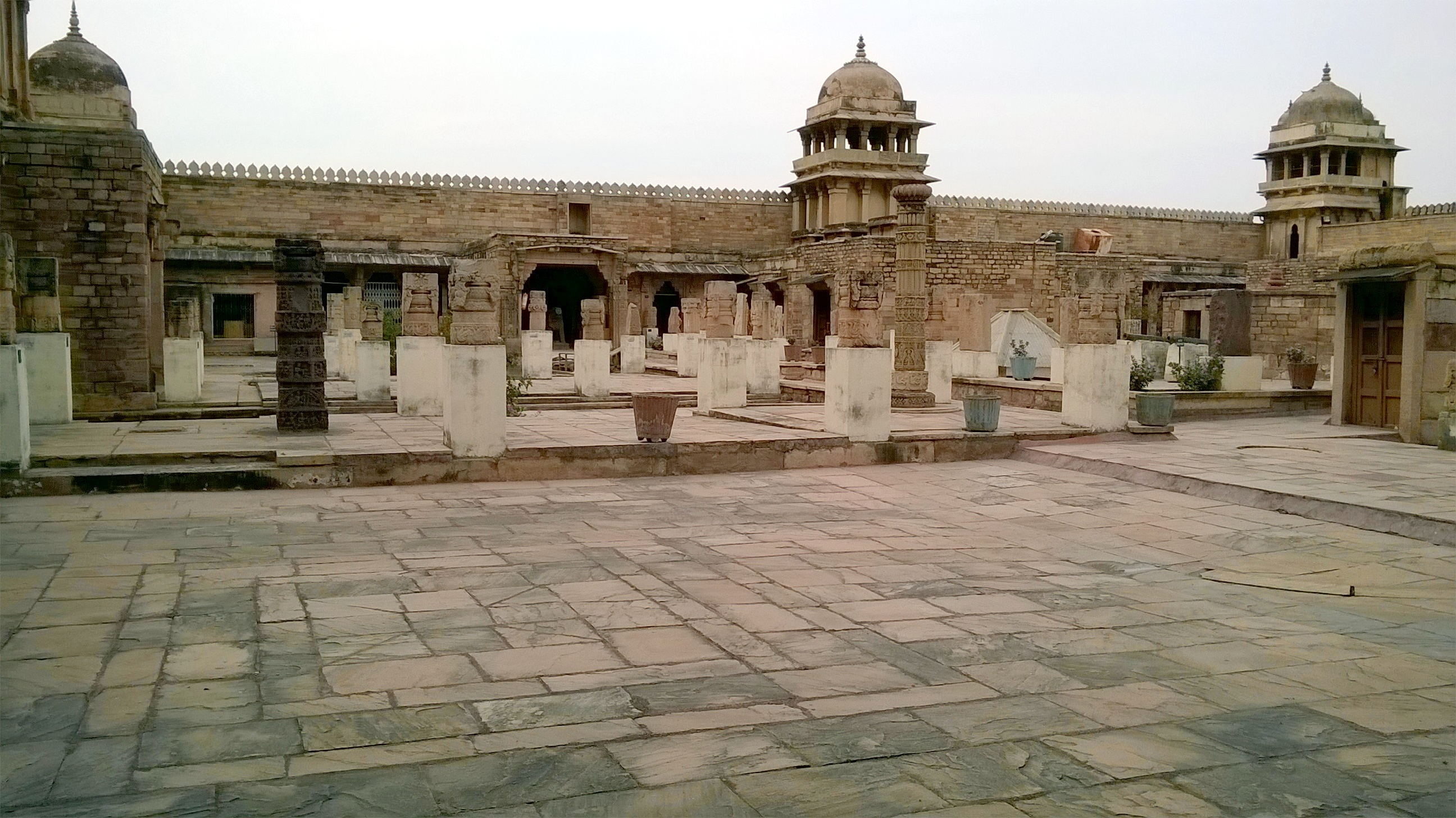
Panorama.

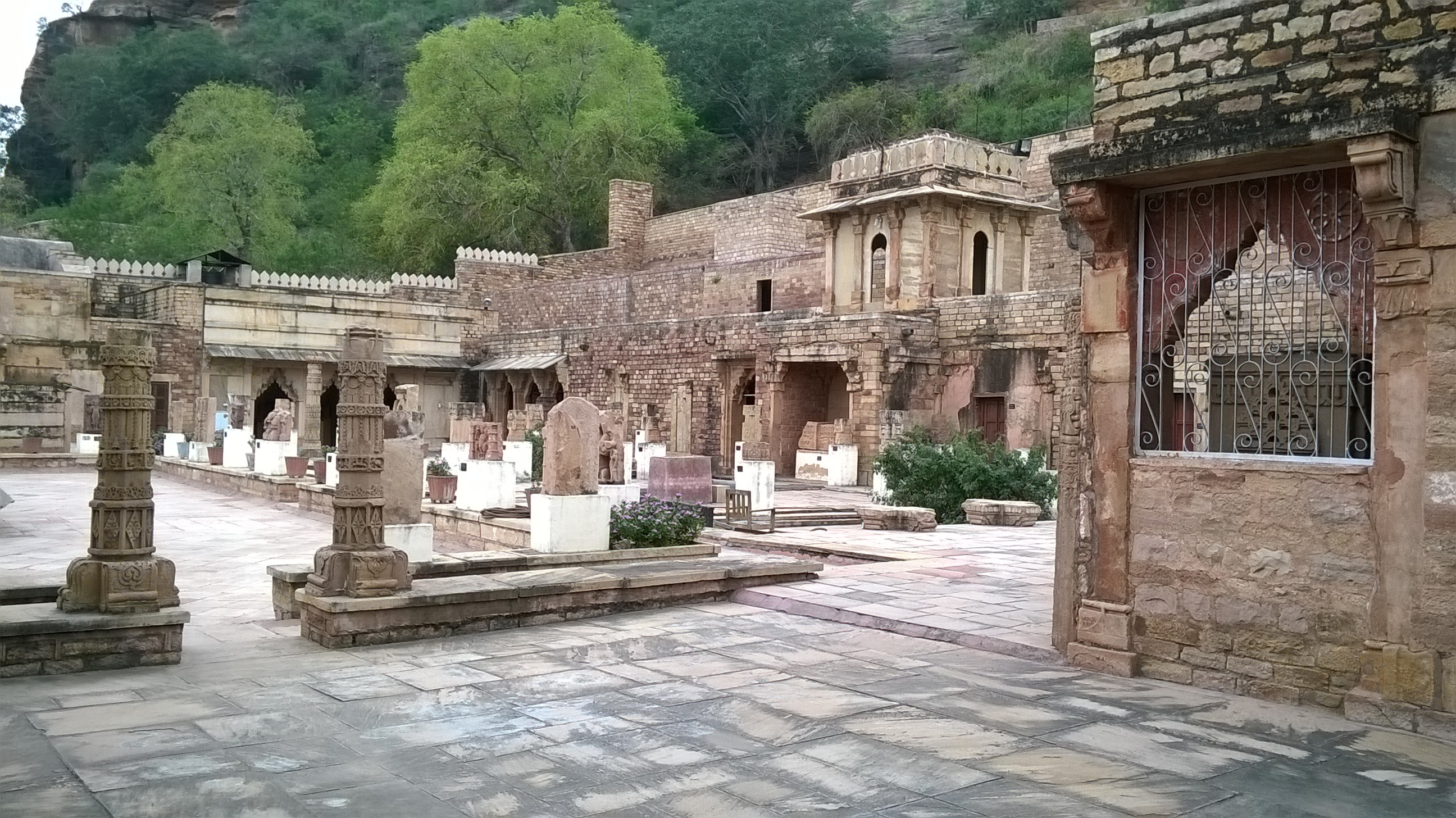
Another view.

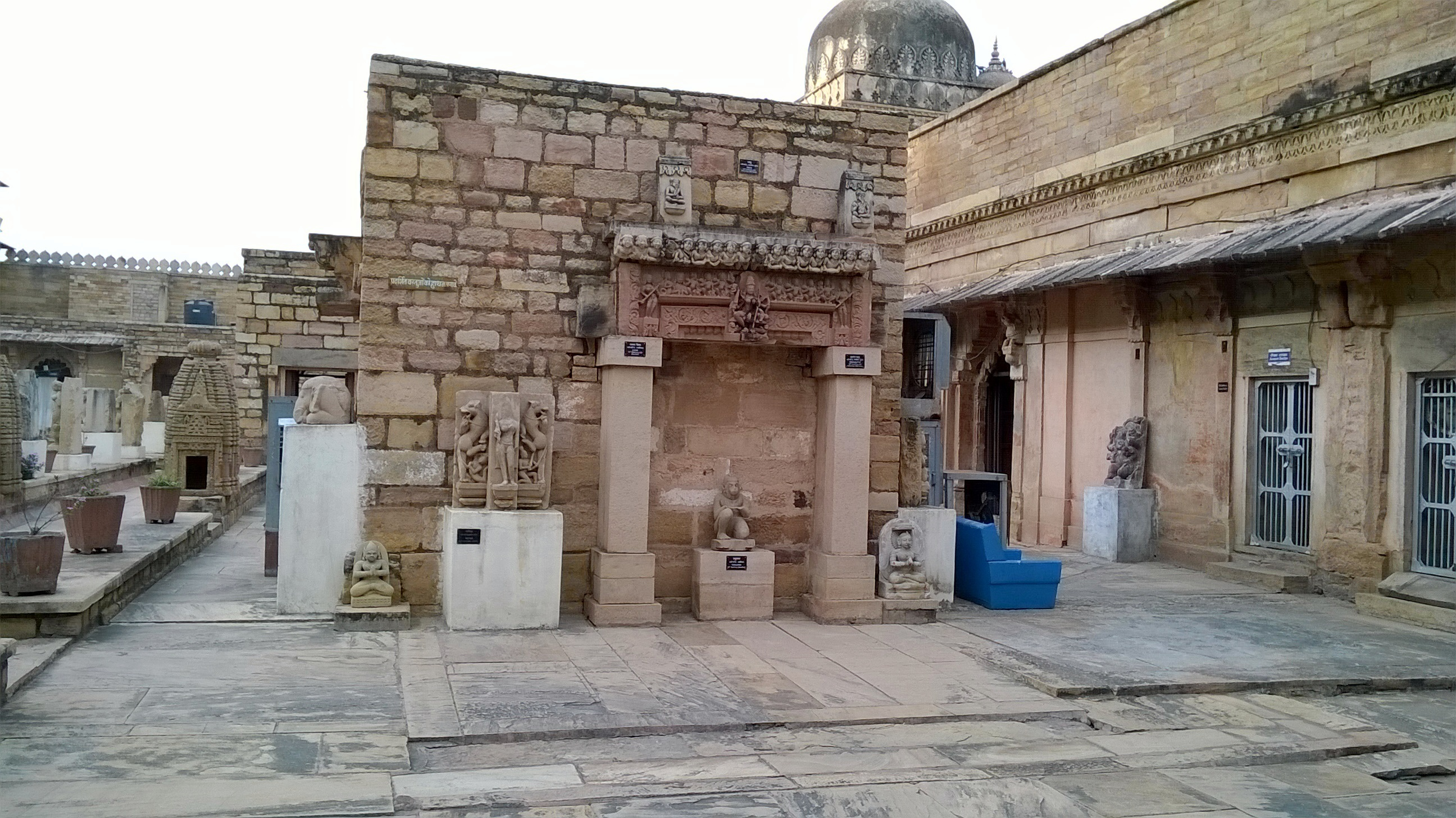
Corner.

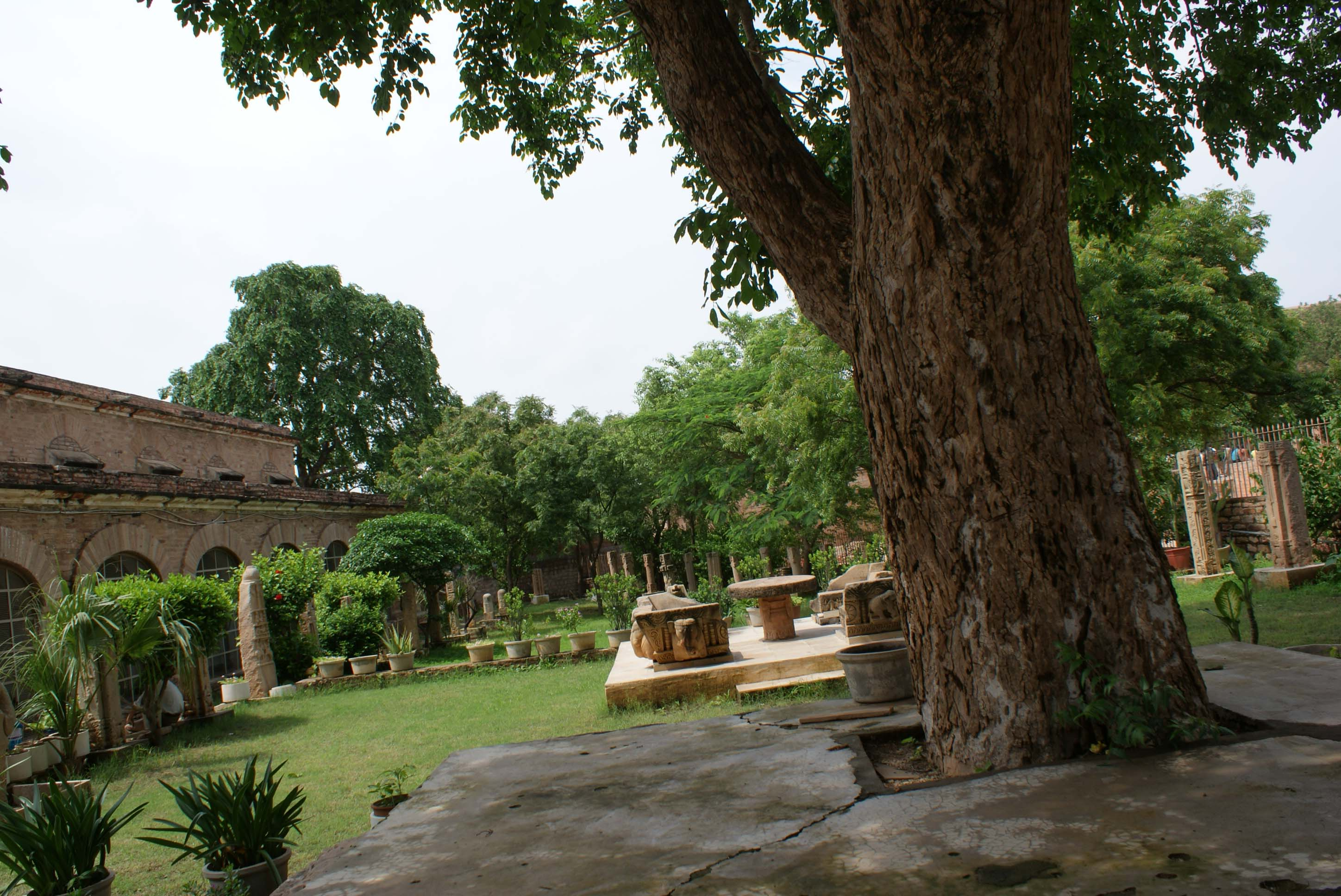
Exterior.

This area was turned into an archaeological museum by the Government of British India in 1922. It displays numerous artifacts of the region, including a fragment of the Garuda capital of the Heliodorus pillar from Vidisha.

== Gallery ==
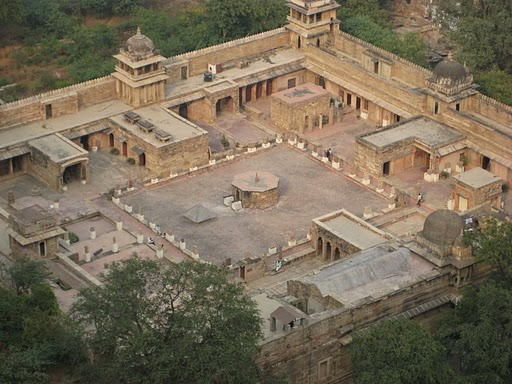
The Gujari Mahal fortress.

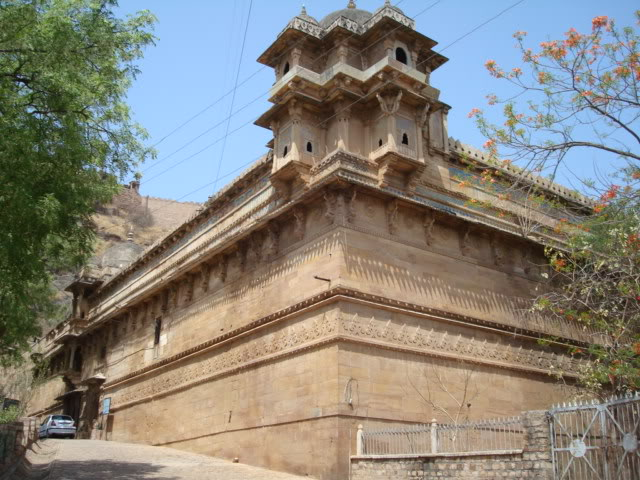
The Gujari Mahal fortress.

== See also ==
- Gwalior Contingent
