= Devabhuti =

Emperor of Magadha from 83 to 75 BCE

Emperor of Magadha
- Reign: 83–75 BCE
- Predecessor: Bhagabhadra
- Successor: Vasudeva Kanva
Names
- Guruprasad
- Dynasty: Shunga
- Religion: Hinduism

Devabhuti (r. 83 – 75 BCE), also known as Devbhomi, was the last Shunga Emperor in ancient India. He was assassinated by his minister Vasudeva Kanva. Following his death, the Shunga dynasty was then replaced by the subsequent Kanvas.

== Reign ==
The later Shunga Emperors after Pushyamitra Shunga, had little power and were puppets in the hands of their ministers. According to Bana's Harshacharita, he was assassinated by his prime minister Vasudeva Kanva with help of the daughter of a slave woman of Devabhuti, who disguised herself as his empress.

He is said to have been overly fond of the company of women and to have been overindulgent in sensual pleasures.

Preceded by Bhagabhadra	Shunga Ruler; 83–75 BCE	Succeeded by Kanva dynasty
