= Epigraphical Hybrid Sanskrit =

Indo-Aryan dialect

- Region: India
- Era: ca. 1 CE to 400 CE
- Language family: Indo-European: Indo-Iranian; Indo-Aryan; Epigraphical Hybrid Sanskrit
- Early forms: Proto-Indo-European: Proto-Indo-Iranian; Proto-Indo-Aryan
- Writing system: Kushana Brahmi

Language codes
- ISO 639-3: –
- Glottolog: None

Epigraphical Hybrid Sanskrit (EHS) was a hybridized dialect of Prakrit and Sanskrit used in Indian inscriptions from the 1st century CE to the 4rd century CE.

It is particularly associated with Mathura, and areas of Indo-Scythian and Kushana rule. It eventually gave way to Sanskrit proper, with which it previously coexisted along with Monumental Prakrit.

== Characteristics ==
Epigraphical Hybrid Sanskrit inscriptions exhibited a spectrum of hybridization, from "Prakrit influenced by Sanskrit" on the one hand to "Sanskrit influenced by Prakrit" on the other.

Generally, it exhibited Sanskritic orthography / phonology (including unassimilated consonant clusters) together with Prakritic morphology and syntax.

Typical morphology:

- Nominative singular masculine ending for a-stems in -o instead of Sanskrit -aḥ
- Genitive singular masculine ending in -sya instead of Prakrit -ssa, also extended to non a-stems for which Sanskrit would use other endings
- Nominative singular masculine ending in -i for -in-stems
- Instrumental plural suffix -ehi instead of Sanskrit -bhis
- Preservation or restoration of Sanskrit-type consonant clusters in forms whose Middle Indo-Aryan equivalents show assimilation, sometimes producing hyper-Sanskrit forms.

== Sample ==
A sample inscription from the Kankali Tila torana in Mathura:

bhadata-jayasenasya āṃtevāsinīye dhāmaghoṣaye dān[o] pāsādo

== See also ==
- Buddhist Hybrid Sanskrit
