= Monumental Prakrit =

Middle Indo-Aryan dialect

- Region: India
- Era: ca. 200 BCE to 450 CE
- Language family: Indo-European: Indo-Iranian; Indo-Aryan; Monumental Prakrit
- Early forms: Proto-Indo-European: Proto-Indo-Iranian; Proto-Indo-Aryan
- Writing system: Brahmi

Language codes
- ISO 639-3: –
- Glottolog: None

Monumental Prakrit was a Middle Indo-Aryan dialect used as a lingua franca in Indian inscriptions from the 2nd century BCE to the 3rd century CE.

It developed out of a west-central dialect closely related to the Ashokan Prakrit exhibited in the Girnar Rock Edicts, with a resemblance to literary Pali.

After the end of the Mauryan Empire, it became the dominant inscriptional language in India outside of Northwestern India before being gradually replaced by Epigraphical Hybrid Sanskrit and Sanskrit, first in North India and then in Southern India where it was last evidenced in the 5th century CE.

Monumental Prakrit is often simply labeled as Prakrit in articles describing inscriptions.

== Characteristics ==
According to Richard Salomon, Monumental Prakrit "partakes of the typical characteristics of the western and central MIA languages":

- Nominative singular masculine ending -o instead of -e
- Retained both Sanskrit r and l
- Sibilants were typically reduced to s

== Sample ==
A sample inscription from the Bharhut stupa:

jetavena anādhapeḍiko deti kotisaṃthatena ketā
