= Vasujyeshtha =

Shunga emperor from 141 to 131 BCE

Emperor of Magadha
- Reign: c. 141 – c. 131 BCE
- Predecessor: Agnimitra
- Successor: Vasumitra
- Dynasty: Shunga
- Father: Agnimitra
- Religion: Hinduism

Vasujyeshtha (r. 141 – 131 BCE), also known as Sujyeshtha, Vasujyestha, and Sujyestha, was the third Shunga Emperor, who reigned over what is now Northern and Central India. He succeeded his father, the Emperor Agnimitra upon the latter's death in 141 BCE. His reign, attested to by coinage, is not well documented and little is known about him. He is credited with successfully completing his grandfather Pushyamitra Shunga's Ashvamedha Yajna and defeating forces of the Indo-Greek Kingdom along the banks of the Sindhu River. His achievements are mentioned briefly in the play Malavikagnimitra, composed during the later Gupta era by Kalidasa.
