= Vasumitra =

Shunga emperor from 131 to 124 BCE

- Emperor

Emperor of Magadha
- Reign: c. 131 – c. 124 BCE
- Predecessor: Vasujyeshtha
- Successor: Bhadraka
- Died: 124 BCE
- Dynasty: Shunga
- Father: Agnimitra
- Mother: Dharini
- Religion: Hinduism

Vasumitra (or Sumitra, according to the d manuscript of the Matsya Purana) (r. 131 – 124 BCE; died 124 BCE) was the fourth Shunga Emperor, who reigned from 131 to 124 BCE. He was the son of Emperor Agnimitra by his empress-consort Dharini and the brother or half-brother of Emperor Vasujyesththa and the step son of Empress Mālavikā, the third wife of Emperor Agnimitra.

== Life ==
=== Early life ===
In the Mālavikāgnimitram, act 5, verse 14, Kālidāsa tells us that Vasumitra guarded the sacrificial horse let loose by his grandfather Pushyamitra Shunga and he defeated a cavalry squadron of the Yona (Indo-Greeks) on the banks of the Indus River. At the news of the victory of her son Vasumitra, Dharini promises to reward Mālavikā, gives her to the King and gladly consents to their union. Vasumitra's victory played a vital role in the union of his father Agnimitra and Mālavikā.

After this happy termination of the course of the royal love, the play ends with the customary Bharatavakya which here takes the form of an expression of general peace and happiness among the King's subjects.

=== Reign ===
According to Sailendra Nath Sen, he (Vasumitra) "After becoming king, gave himself up to pleasure". But we know that the Shunga decline began during his reign. Sensing an opportunity, enemies began plotting. Banabhatta's Harshacharita mentioned him as Sumitra and informed us that he was killed by Mitradeva (or Muladeva, according to some manuscripts) while enjoying a drama. Muladeva is regarded as the founder of the independent Principality of Kosala. The secession of Kosala extinguished the Shunga hold over territories west of Magadha but also must have encouraged other rulers to rebel and declare independence. Examples of these include Panchala, Kausambi, and Mathura.

== Succession ==
He was succeeded by Andhraka, Antaka, Bhagabhadra or Bhadra according to different puranas.

Preceded by Vasujyeshtha	Shunga Emperor; 131–124 BCE	Succeeded by Bhadraka
