= Vidarbha kingdom (Mauryan era) =

Ancient Indian kingdom

The Vidarbha kingdom (Mauryan era) was a kingdom which controlled the Vidarbha region of present-day Maharashtra. It was formed when a former Mauryan sachiva (secretary) put his brother-in-law Yajnasena on the throne, and declared independence.

== War with Shungas ==
=== Battle of Vidarbha ===
Madhavasena, a cousin of Yajnasena, sought help from Agnimitra, the king of the Shunga Empire in overthrowing his cousin. He set out for Vidisha, the current Shunga capital, but was spotted by some of Yajnasena's soldiers and captured while crossing the border of Vidarbha and imprisoned. Agnimitra demanded the release of Madhavasena, and in return Yajnasena demanded the release of the former Mauryan minister, who had been captured earlier by Agnimitra.

Instead, Agnimitra sent his army to invade Vidarbha. Yajnasena was defeated and forced to divide Vidarbha with Madhavasena, and both cousins recognized the suzerainty of the Shunga rulers.
