= Shunga Empire =

Indian empire (185–73 BCE)

- 185 BCE–73 BCE
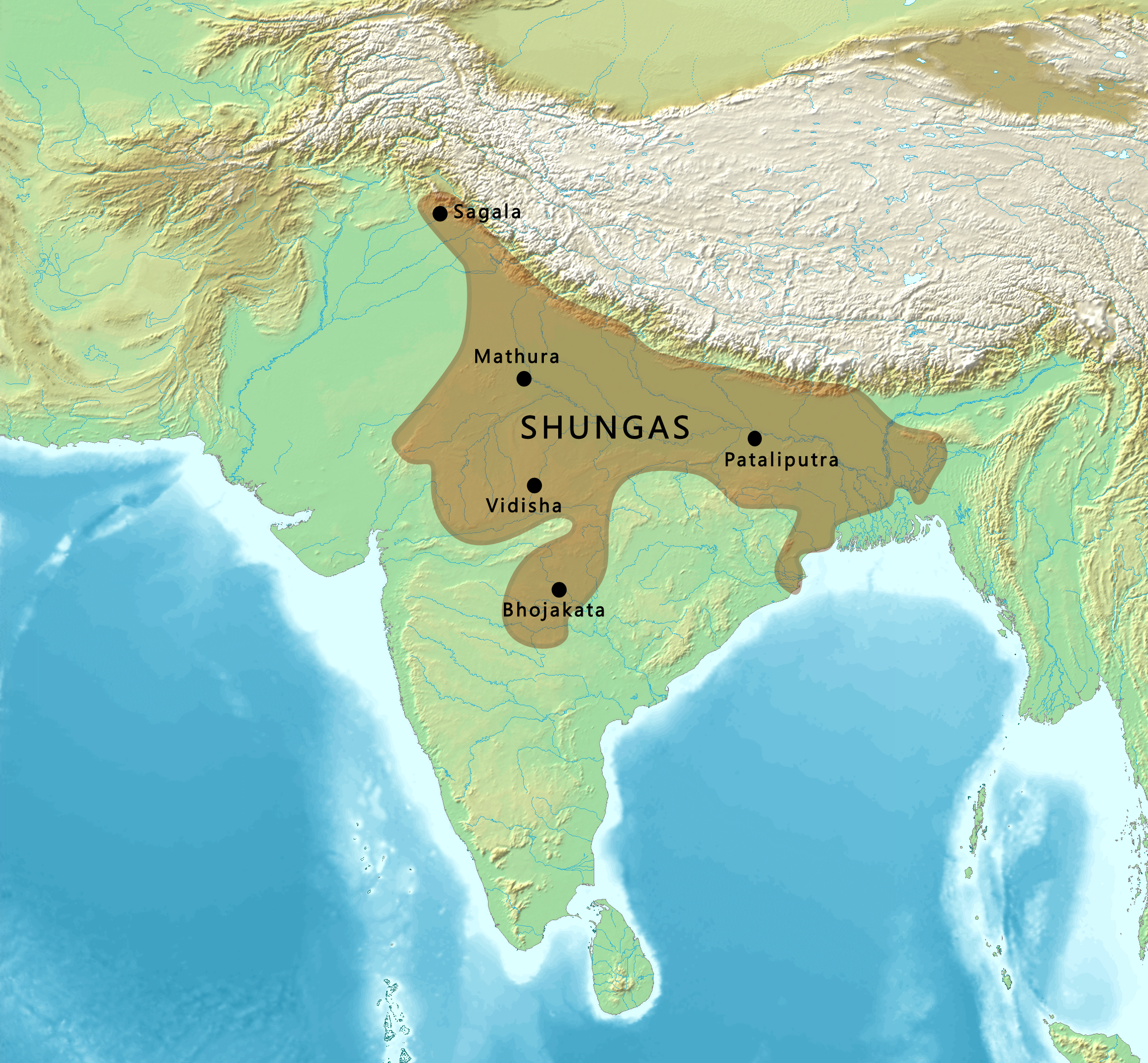
- Territory of the Shungas c. 150 BCE.
- Capital: Pataliputra; Besnagara
- Common languages: Sanskrit
- Religion: Brahmanism
- Government: Monarchy
- Emperor
  - c. 185 – c. 151 BCE: Pushyamitra (first)
  - c. 151–141 BCE: Agnimitra
  - c. 131–124 BCE: Vasumitra
  - c. 83–73 BCE: Devabhuti (last)
- Historical era: Ancient India
  - Assassination of Brihadratha by Pushyamitra Shunga: 185 BCE
  - Assassination of Devabhuti by Vasudeva Kanva: 73 BCE
Preceded by
| Maurya Empire |
| Vidarbha kingdom (Mauryan era) |
Succeeded by
| Kanva dynasty |
| Kosala |
| Avanti (region) |
| Panchala |
| Ancient Nepal |
- Today part of: India; Bangladesh; Nepal; Pakistan

The Shunga Empire (IAST: Śuṅga) was a ruling entity centred around Magadha and controlled most of the northern Indian subcontinent from around 187 to 75 BCE. The dynasty was established by Pushyamitra, after taking the throne of Magadha from the Mauryas. The Shunga empire's capital was Pataliputra, but later emperors such as Bhagabhadra also held court at Besnagar (modern Vidisha) in eastern Malwa. This dynasty is also responsible for successfully fighting and resisting the Greeks in Shunga–Greek War.

Pushyamitra ruled for 36 years and was succeeded by his son Agnimitra. There were ten Shunga rulers. However, after the death of Agnimitra, the second king of the dynasty, the empire rapidly disintegrated: inscriptions and coins indicate that much of northern and central India consisted of small kingdoms and city-states that were independent of any Shunga hegemony. The dynasty is noted for its numerous wars with both foreign and indigenous powers. They fought the Kalinga, the Satavahana dynasty, the Indo-Greek kingdom and possibly the Panchalas and Mitras of Mathura.

Art, education, philosophy, and other forms of learning flowered during this period, including small terracotta images, larger stone sculptures, and architectural monuments such as the stupa at Bharhut, and the renowned Great Stupa at Sanchi. The Shunga rulers helped to establish the tradition of royal sponsorship of learning and art. The script used by the empire was a variant of Brahmi script and was used to write Sanskrit.

The Shungas were important patrons of culture at a time when some of the most important developments in Hindu thought were taking place. Patanjali's Mahābhāṣya was composed in this period. Artistry also progressed with the rise of the Mathura art style.

The last of the Shunga emperors was Devabhuti (83–73 BCE). He was assassinated by his minister Vasudeva Kanva and was said to have been overfond of the company of women. The Kanva dynasty succeeded the Shungas around 73 BCE.

== Name ==
The name "Shunga" has only been used for convenience to designate the historical polity now generally described as "Shunga empire", or the historical period known as the "Shunga period", which follows the fall of the Maurya Empire. The term appears in a single epigraphic inscription in Bharhut, in which a dedication to the Buddhist Bharhut stupa is said to have been made "at the time of the Suga kings" (Suganam raje), with no indication as to whom these "Suga kings" might be. Other broadly contemporary inscriptions, such as the Heliodorus pillar inscription, are only assumed to relate to Shunga rulers. The Ayodhya Inscription of Dhana mentions a ruler named Pushyamitra, but does not mention the name "Shunga".

The Bharut epigraph appears on a pillar of the gateway of the stupa, and mentions its erection "during the rule of the Sugas, by Vatsiputra Dhanabhuti". The expression used (Suganam raje, Brahmi script: 𑀲𑀼𑀕𑀦𑀁 𑀭𑀚𑁂), may mean "during the rule of the Sugas [Shungas]", although not without ambiguity as it could also be "during the rule of the Sughanas", a northern Buddhist kingdom. There is no other instance of the name "Shunga" in the epigraphical record of India. The unique inscription reads:

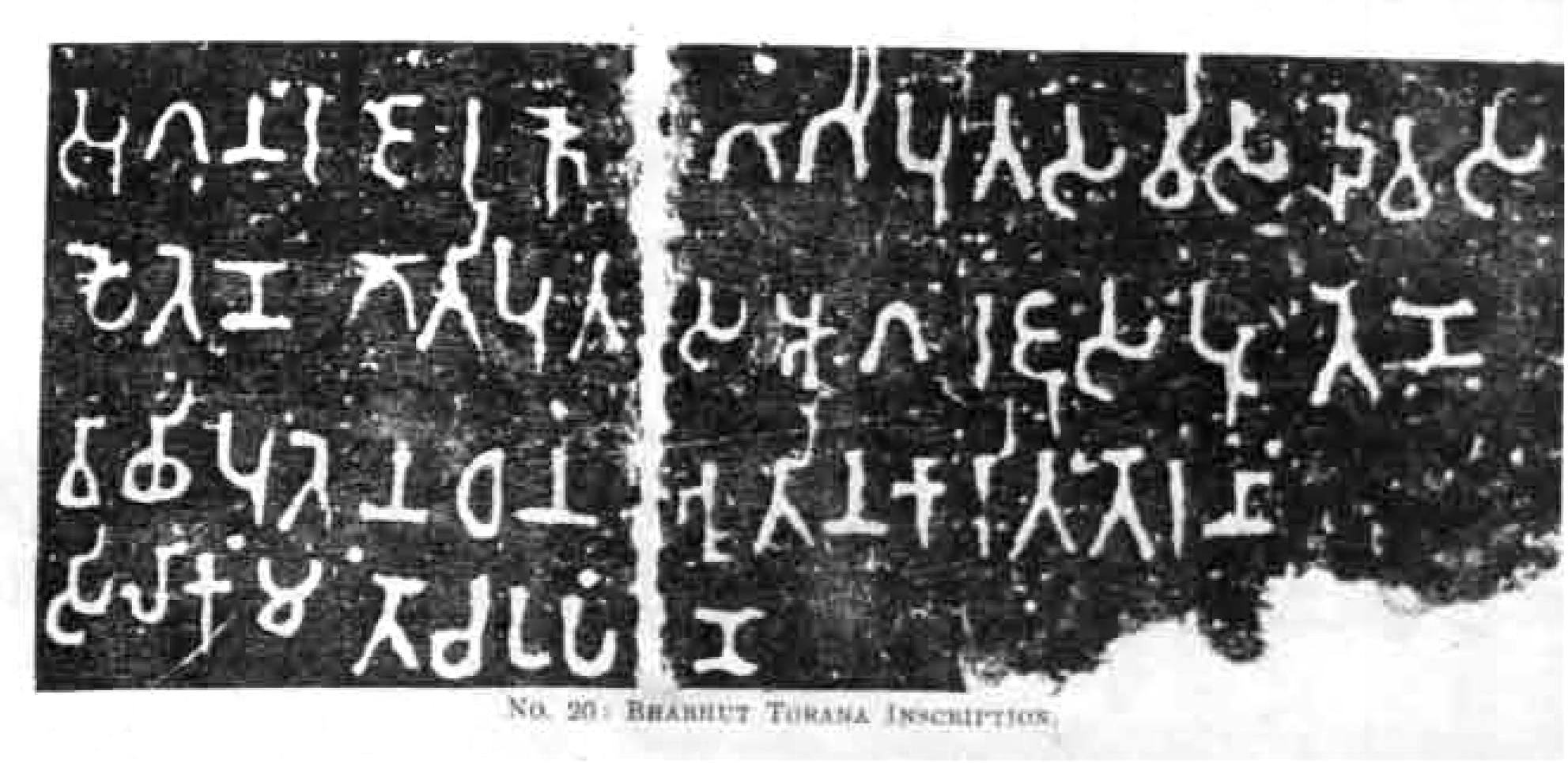
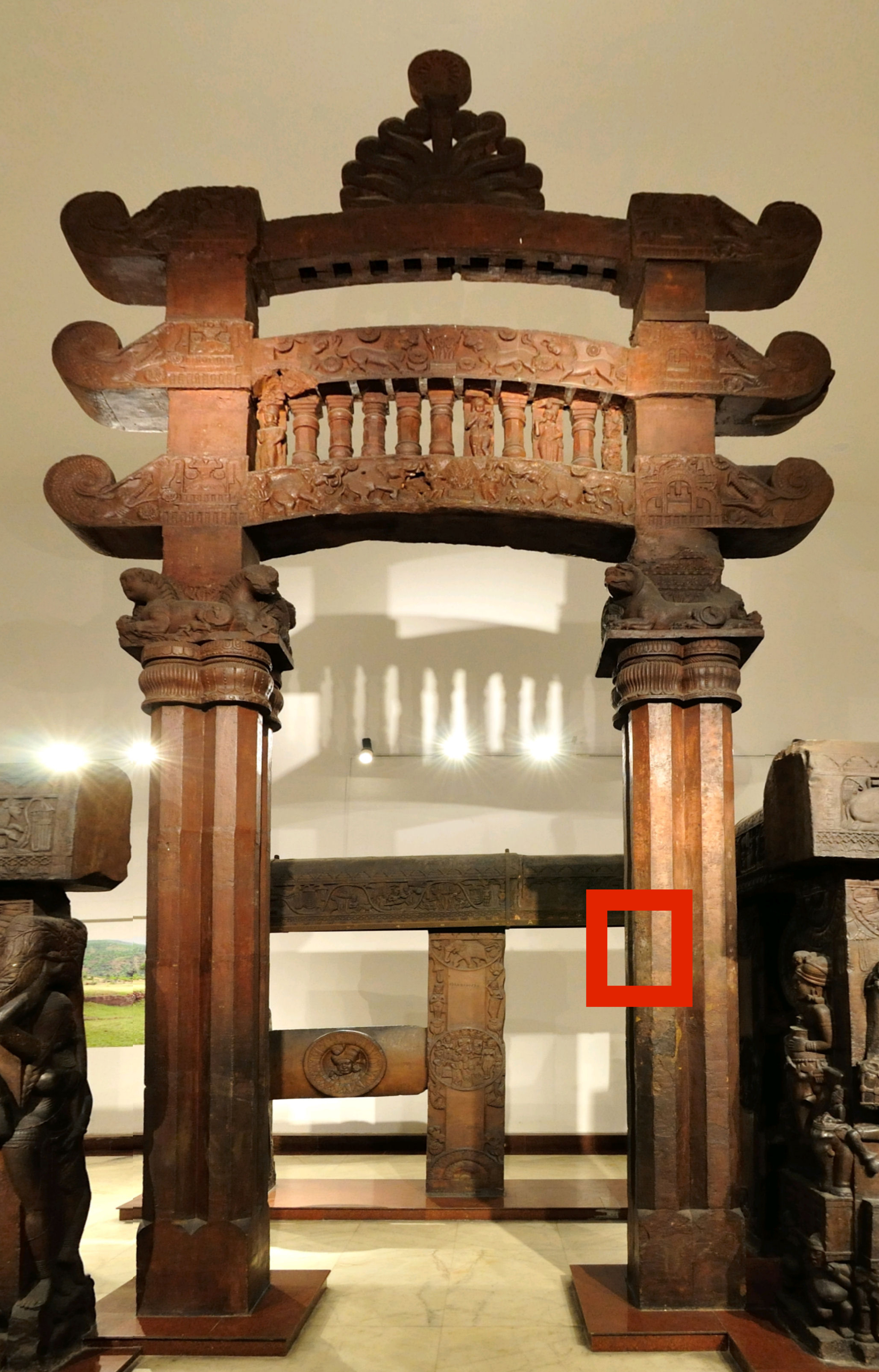
The Dhanabhuti inscription, and the torana on which it is inscribed. Bharhut

1. Suganam raje raño Gāgīputasa Visadevasa
2. pautena, Gotiputasa Āgarajusa putena
3. Vāchhīputena Dhanabhūtina kāritam toranām
4. silākammamto cha upamno.

During the reign of the Sugas (Sughanas, or Shungas) the gateway was caused to be made and the stone-work presented by Dhanabhūti, the son of Vāchhī, son of Agaraju, the son of a Goti and grandson of king Visadeva, the son of Gāgī.

— Gateway pillar inscription of Dhanabhūti.

Dhanabhuti was making a major dedication to a Buddhist monument, Bharhut, whereas the historical "Shungas" are known to have been Hindu monarchs, which would suggest that Dhanabhuti himself may not have been a member of the Shunga dynasty. Neither is he known from "Shunga" regnal lists. The mention "in the reign of the Shungas" also suggests that he was not himself a Shunga ruler, only that he may have been a tributary of the Shungas, or a ruler in a neighbouring territory, such as Kosala or Panchala.

The name "Sunga" or "Shunga" is also used in the Vishnu Purana, the date of which is contested, to designate the dynasty of kings starting with Pushyamitra c. 185 BCE, and ending with Devabhuti circa 75 BCE. According to the Vishnu Purana:

Ten Maurya kings will reign for one hundred and thirty-seven years. After them the Śuṅgas will rule the earth. The general Puṣpamitra will kill his sovereign and usurp the kingdom. His son will be Agnimitra. His son will be Sujyeṣṭha. His son will be Vasumitra. His son will be Ārdraka. His son will be Pulindaka. His son will be Ghoṣavasu. His son will be Vajramitra. His son will be Bhāgavata. His son will be Devabhūti. These ten Śuṅgas will rule the earth for one hundred and twelve years.

— Vishnu Purana, Book Four: The Royal Dynasties.

== Origins ==
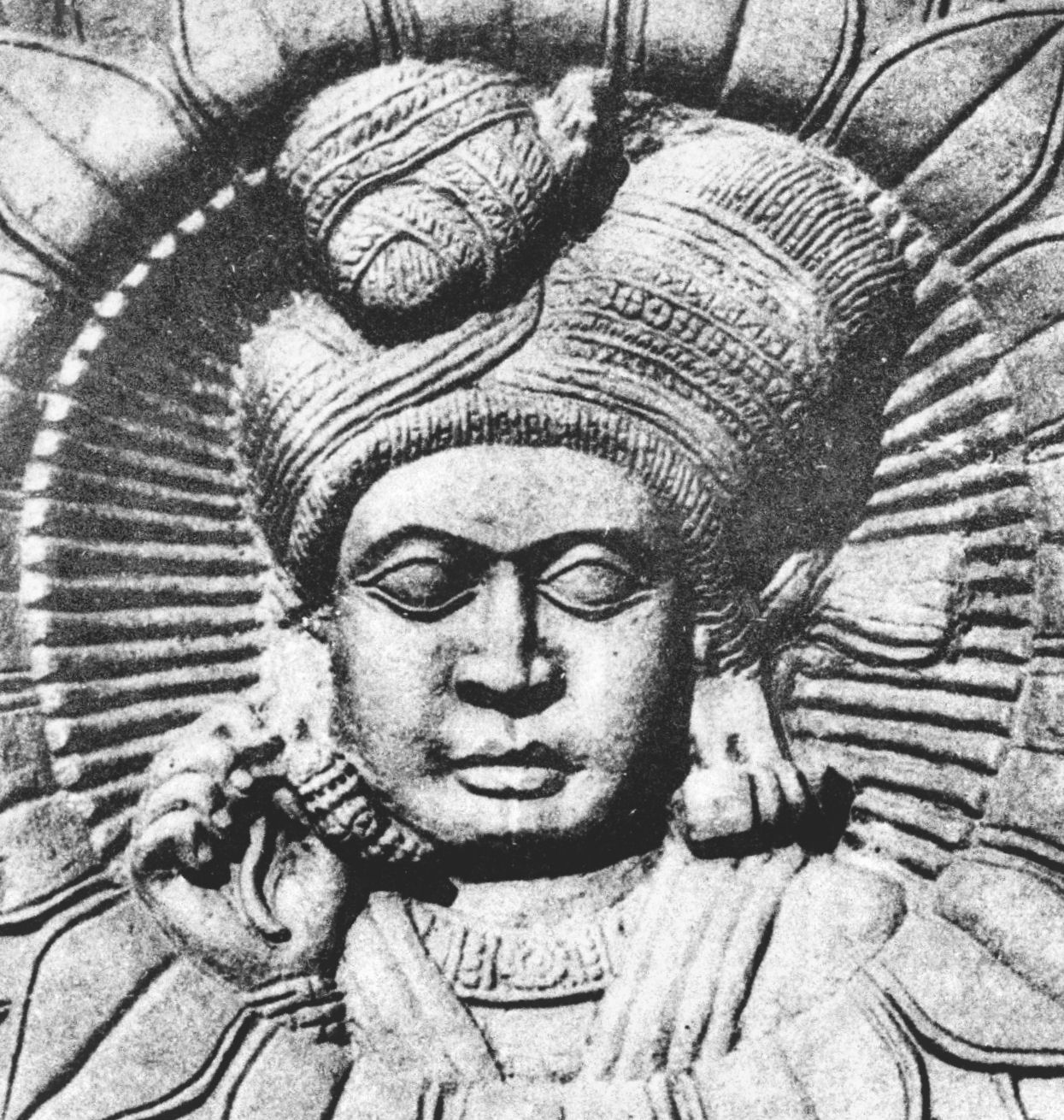
Man on a relief, Bharhut, Shunga period.

According to historical reconstructions, the Shunga dynasty was established in 184 BCE, about 50 years after Ashoka's death, when the emperor Brihadratha Maurya, the last ruler of the Maurya Empire, was assassinated by his Senānī or commander-in-chief, Pushyamitra, while he was reviewing the Guard of Honour of his forces. Pushyamitra then ascended the throne.

Pushyamitra became the ruler of Magadha and neighbouring territories. His realm essentially covered the central parts of the old Mauryan Empire. The Shunga definitely had control of the central city of Ayodhya in northern central India, as is proved by the Dhanadeva-Ayodhya inscription. However, the city of Mathura further west never seems to have been under the direct control of the Shungas, as no archaeological evidence of a Shunga presence has ever been found in Mathura. On the contrary, according to the Yavanarajya inscription, Mathura was probably under the control of Indo-Greeks from some time between 180 BCE and 100 BCE, and remained so as late as 70 BCE.

Some ancient sources however claim a greater extent for the Shunga empire: the Asokavadana account of the Divyavadana claims that the Shungas sent an army to persecute Buddhist monks as far as Sakala (Sialkot) in the Punjab region in the northwest:

... Pushyamitra equipped a fourfold army, and intending to destroy the Buddhist religion, he went to the Kukkutarama (in Pataliputra). ... Pushyamitra therefore destroyed the sangharama, killed the monks there, and departed. ... After some time, he arrived in Sakala, and proclaimed that he would give a ... reward to whoever brought him the head of a Buddhist monk.

Also, the Malavikagnimitra claims that the empire of Pushyamitra extended to the Narmada River in the south. They may also have controlled the city of Ujjain. Meanwhile, Kabul and much of the Punjab passed into the hands of the Indo-Greeks and the Deccan Plateau to the Satavahana dynasty.

Pushyamitra died after ruling for 36 years (187–151 BCE). He was succeeded by son Agnimitra. This prince is the hero of a famous drama by one of India's greatest playwrights, Kālidāsa. Agnimitra was viceroy of Vidisha when the story takes place.

The power of the Shungas gradually weakened. It is said that there were ten Shunga emperors. The Shungas were succeeded by the Kanva dynasty around 73 BCE.

== Decline of Buddhism ==
=== Accounts of persecution ===
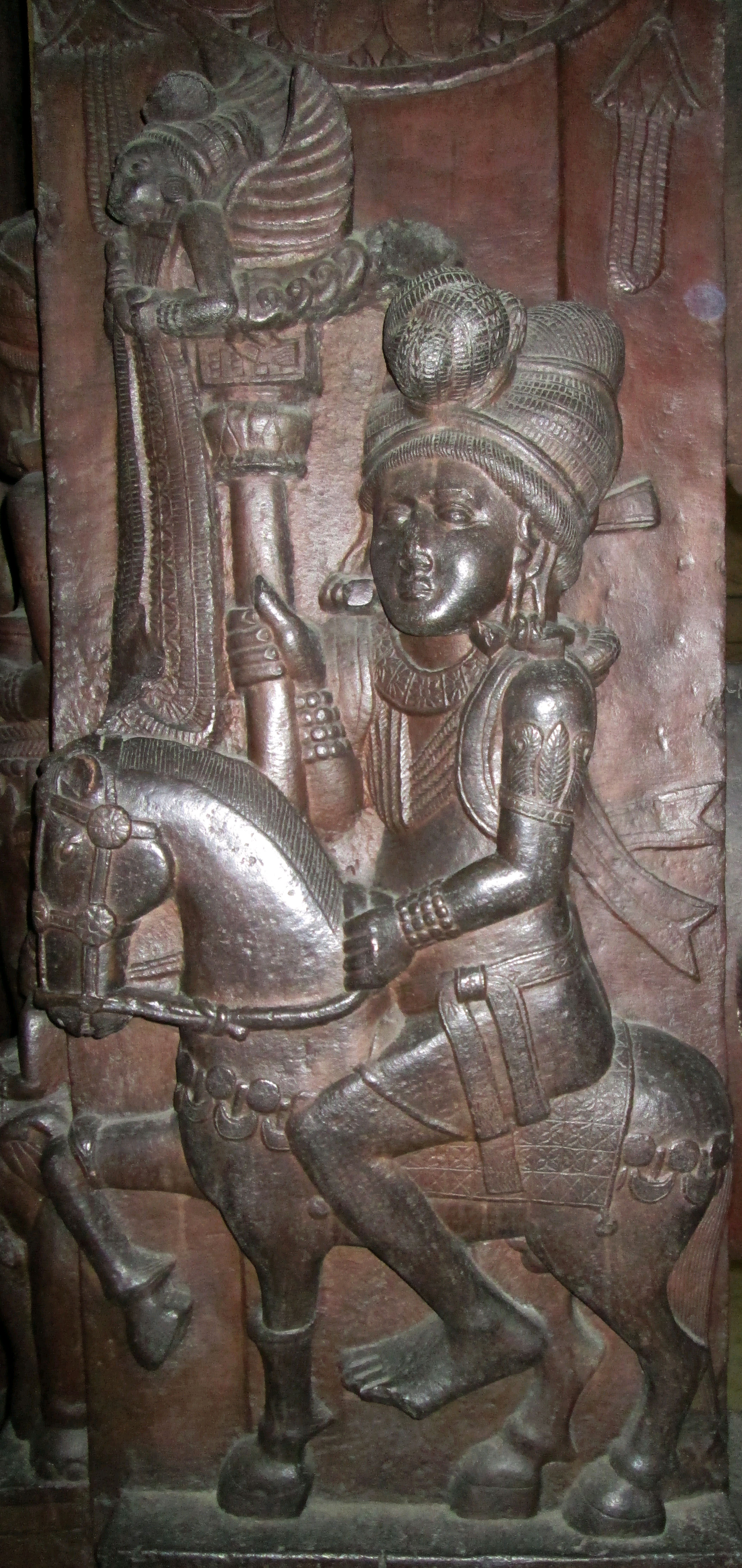
Shunga horseman, Bharhut.

Following the Mauryans, the first Sunga emperor, a Brahmin named Pushyamitra, is believed by some historians to have persecuted Buddhists and contributed to a resurgence of Brahmanism that forced Buddhism outwards to Kashmir, Gandhara and Bactria. Buddhist scripture such as the Ashokavadana account of the Divyavadana and ancient Tibetan historian Taranatha have written about persecution of Buddhists. Pushyamitra is said to have burned down Buddhist monasteries, destroyed stupas, massacred Buddhist monks and put rewards on their heads, but some consider these stories as probable exaggerations.

"... Pushyamitra equipped a fourfold army, and intending to destroy the Buddhist religion, he went to the Kukkutarama. ... Pushyamitra therefore destroyed the sangharama, killed the monks there, and departed. ... After some time, he arrived in Sakala, and proclaimed that he would give a ... reward to whoever brought him the head of a Buddhist monk."

— Asokavadana account of the Divyavadana

Pushyamitra is known to have revived the supremacy of the Bramahnical religion and reestablished animal sacrifices (Yajnas) that had been prohibited by Ashoka. However, in the Harshacharita of Banabhatta, Pushyamitra is referred to as an Anarya (non-Aryan).

=== Accounts against persecution ===
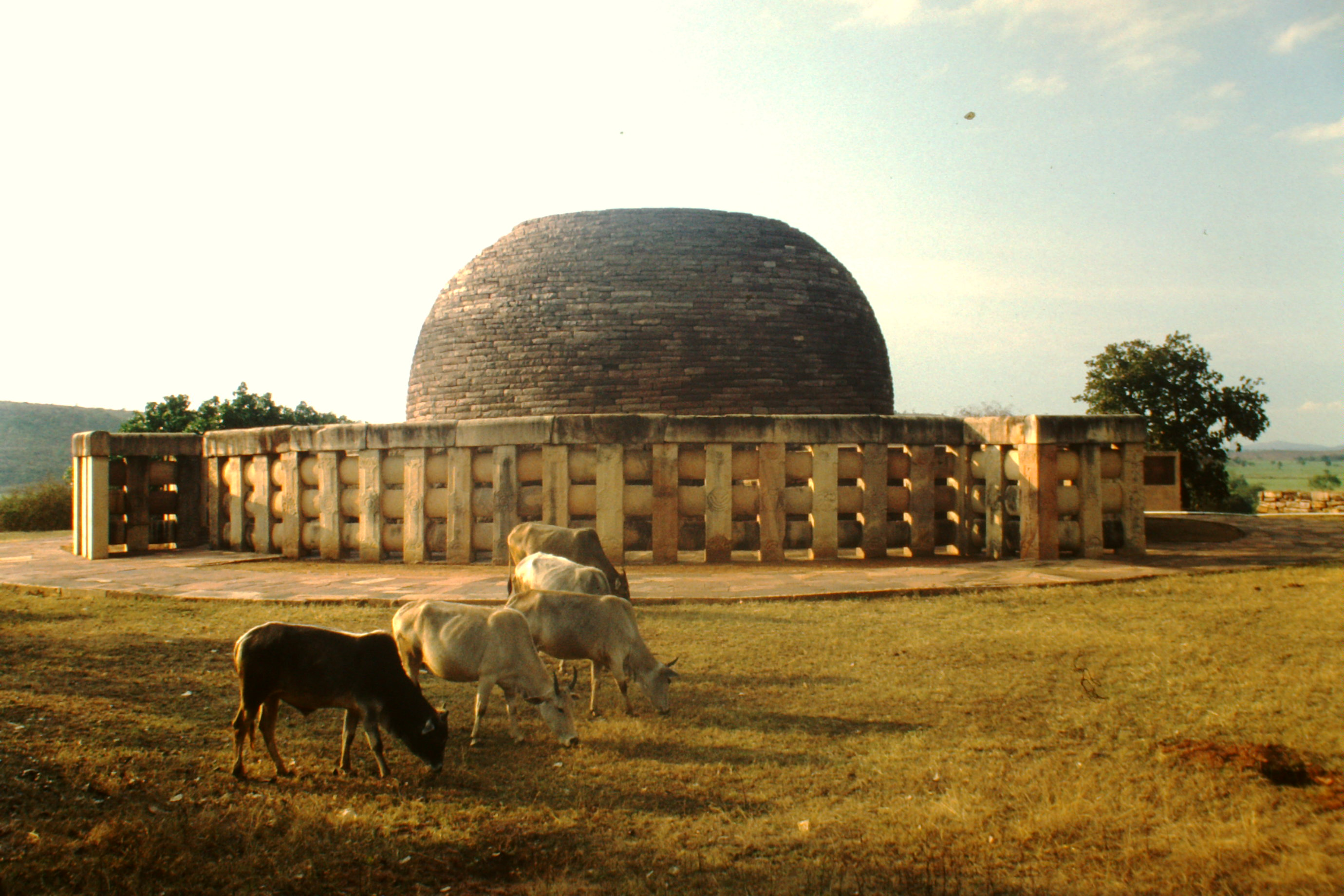
Shunga period stupa at Sanchi.

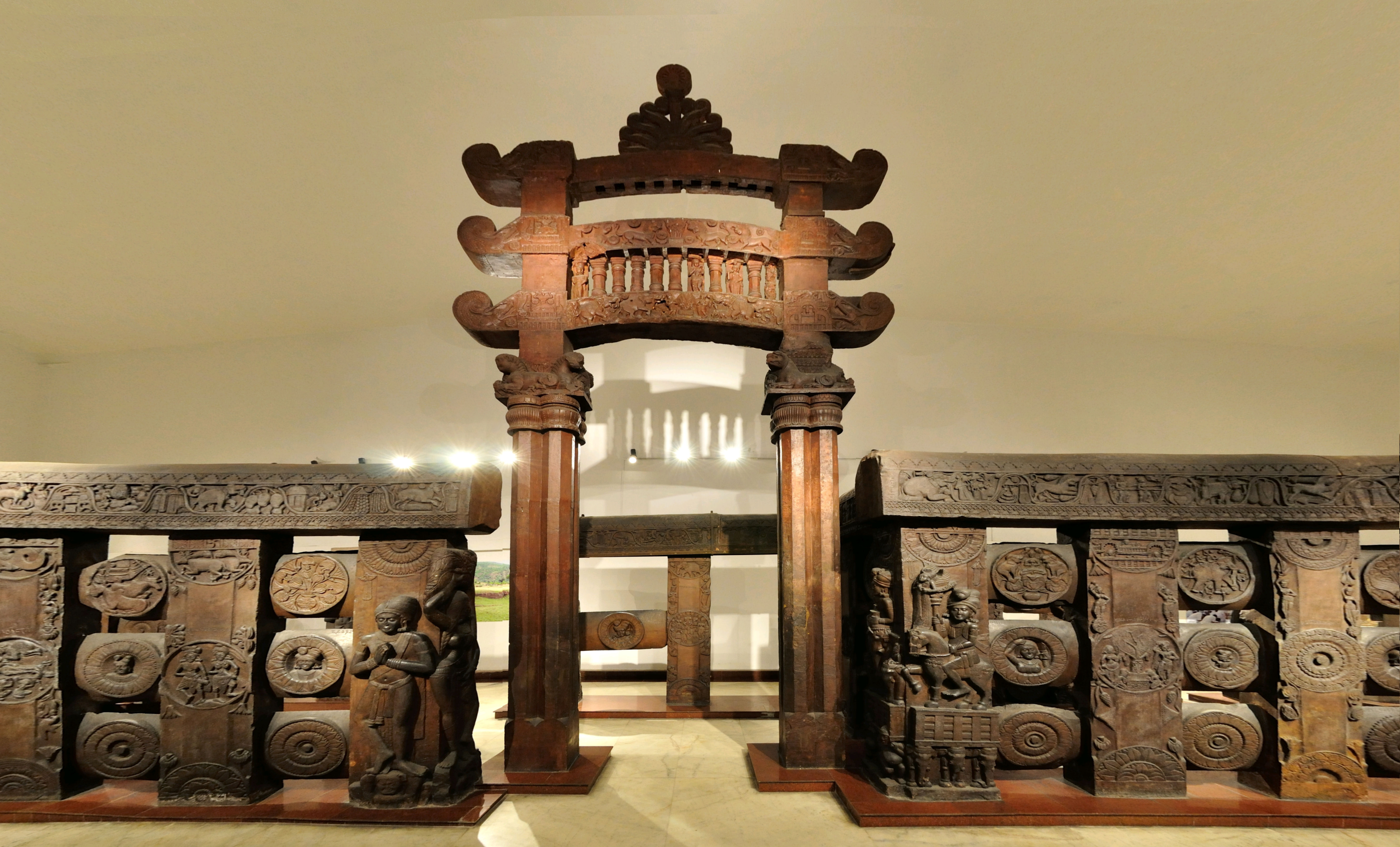
East Gateway and Railings, Red Sandstone, Bharhut Stupa, 2nd century BCE. Indian Museum, Kolkata.

Later Shunga emperors were seen as amenable to Buddhism and as having contributed to the building of the stupa at Bharhut. During his reign the Buddhist monuments of Bharhut and Sanchi were renovated and further improved. There is enough evidence to show that Pushyamitra patronised Buddhist art. However, given the rather decentralised and fragmentary nature of the Shunga state, with many cities actually issuing their own coinage, as well as the relative dislike of the Shungas for the Buddhist religion, some authors argue that the constructions of that period in Sanchi for example cannot really be called "Shunga". They were not the result of royal sponsorship, in contrast with what happened during the Mauryas, and most of the dedications at Sanchi were private or collective, rather than the result of royal patronage.

Some writers believe that Brahmanism competed in political and spiritual realm with Buddhism in the Gangetic plains. Buddhism flourished in the realms of the Bactrian kings.

Some Indian scholars are of the opinion that the orthodox Shunga emperors were not intolerant towards Buddhism and that Buddhism prospered during the time of the Shunga emperors. The existence of Buddhism in Bengal in the Shunga period can also be inferred from a terracotta tablet that was found at Tamralipti and is on exhibit at the Asutosh Museum in Kolkata.

==== Royal dedications ====
Two dedications by a king named Brahmamitra as well as the monarch Indragnimitra are recorded at the Mahabodhi Temple in Bodh Gaya. Some may claim these show Shunga support for Buddhism. These kings, however, are essentially unknown, and do not form a part of the Shunga recorded genealogy. They are thought to be post-Ashokan and to belong to the period of Shunga rule. A Brahmamitra is known otherwise as a local ruler of Mathura, but Indragnimitra is unknown, and according to some authors, Indragnimitra is in fact not even mentioned as a king in the actual inscription.

- An inscription at Bodh Gaya at the Mahabodhi Temple records the construction of the temple as follows:

"The gift of Nagadevi the wife of King Brahmamitra."

- Another inscription reads:

"The gift of Kurangi, the mother of living sons and the wife of King Indragnimitra, son of Kosiki. The gift also of Srima of the royal palace shrine."

Cunningham has regretted the loss of the latter part of these important records. As regards the first coping inscription, he has found traces of eleven Brahmi letters after "Kuramgiye danam", the first nine of which read "rajapasada-cetika sa". Bloch reads these nine letters as "raja-pasada-cetikasa" and translates this expression in relation to the preceding words:

"(the gift of Kurangi, the wife of Indragnimitra and the mother of living sons), "to the caitya (cetika) of the noble temple", taking the word raja before pasada as an epithet on ornans, distinguishing the temple as a particularly large and stately building similar to such expressions as rajahastin 'a noble elephant', rajahamsa 'a goose' (as distinguished from hamsa 'a duck'), etc."

Cunningham has translated the expression "the royal palace, the caitya", suggesting that "the mention of the raja-pasada would seem to connect the donor with the king's family." Luders doubtfully suggests "to the king's temple" as a rendering of "raja-pasada-cetikasa."

=== Shunga period contributions in Sanchi ===
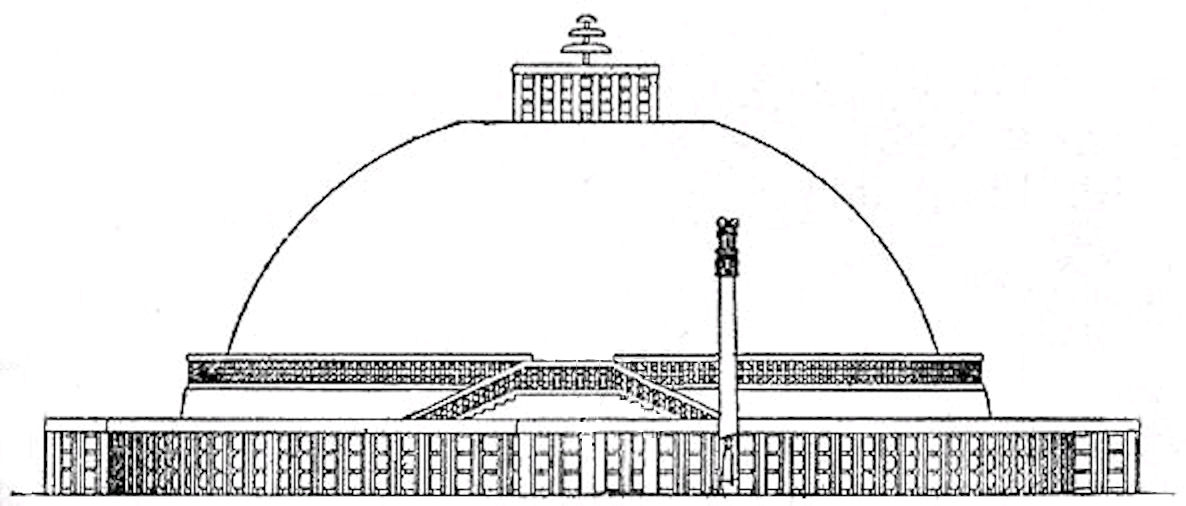
The Great Stupa under the Shungas. The Shungas nearly doubled the diameter of the initial stupa, encasing it in stone, and built a balustrade and a railing around it.

On the basis of Ashokavadana, it is presumed that the stupa may have been vandalised at one point sometime in the 2nd century BCE, an event some have related to the rise of the Shunga emperor Pushyamitra who overtook the Mauryan empire as an army general. It has been suggested that Pushyamitra may have destroyed the original stupa, and his son Agnimitra rebuilt it. The original brick stupa was covered with stone during the Shunga period.

According to historian Julia Shaw, the post-Mauryan constructions at Sanchi cannot be described as "Sunga" as sponsorship for the construction of the stupas, as attested by the numerous donative inscriptions, was not royal but collective, and the Sungas were known for their opposition to Buddhism.

==== Great Stupa (No 1) ====
During the later rule of the Shunga, the stupa was expanded with stone slabs to almost twice its original size. The dome was flattened near the top and crowned by three superimposed parasols within a square railing. With its many tiers it was a symbol of the dharma, the Wheel of the Law. The dome was set on a high circular drum meant for circumambulation, which could be accessed via a double staircase. A second stone pathway at ground level was enclosed by a stone balustrade. The railing around Stupa 1 do not have artistic reliefs. These are only slabs, with some dedicatory inscriptions. These elements are dated to c. 150 BCE.

==== Stupa No2 and Stupa No3 ====
The buildings which seem to have been commissioned during the rule of the Shungas are the Second and Third stupas (but not the highly decorated gateways, which are from the following Satavahana period, as known from inscriptions), and the ground balustrade and stone casing of the Great Stupa (Stupa No 1). The Relics of Sariputra and Mahamoggallana are said to have been placed in Stupa No 3. These are dated to c. 115 BCE for the medallions, 80 BCE for the gateway carvings, slightly after the reliefs of Bharhut, with some reworks down to the 1st century CE.

The style of the Shunga period decorations at Sanchi bear a close similarity to those of Bharhut, as well as the peripheral balustrades at Bodh Gaya, which are thought to be the oldest of the three.

Shunga structures and decorations (150-80 BCE)
| Great Stupa (Stupa expansion and balustrades only are Shunga). Undecorated ground railings dated to approximately 150 BCE. | Shunga balustrade and staircase. Shunga stonework. Shunga vedika (railing) with inscriptions. Deambulatory pathway. Summit railing and umbrellas. |
| Stupa No 2 Entirely Shunga work. The reliefs are thought to date to the last quarter of the 2nd century BCE (c. 115 BCE for the medallions, 80 BCE for the gateway carvings), slightly after the reliefs of Bharhut, with some reworks down to the 1st century CE. | Elephant and Riders. Balustrade post with Lakshmi. Balustrade post with Yaksha. Pillar with elephants supporting a wheel. Personage. Lotus. Floral motif. Foreigner on a horse, c. 115 BCE. Ashoka supported by his two wives. Similar to the later relief at Gateway 1. Relic boxes found inside the stupa. |
| Stupa No 3 (Stupa and balustrades only are Shunga). | Stairway and railing. Lotus medallions. Floral designs. Post relief. Relics of Sariputra and Mahamoggallana. |

== Warfare ==
Main polities in Asia, circa -100

War and conflict characterised the Shunga period. They are known to have warred with the Kalingas, Satavahanas, the Indo-Greeks, and possibly the Panchalas and Mathuras.

The Shunga empire's wars with the Indo-Greek kingdom figure greatly in the history of this period. From around 180 BCE the Greco-Bactrian ruler Demetrius conquered the Kabul Valley and is theorised to have advanced into the trans-Indus to confront the Shungas. The Indo-Greek Menander I is credited with either joining or leading a campaign to Pataliputra with other Indian rulers; however, very little is known about the exact nature and success of the campaign. The net result of these wars remains uncertain.

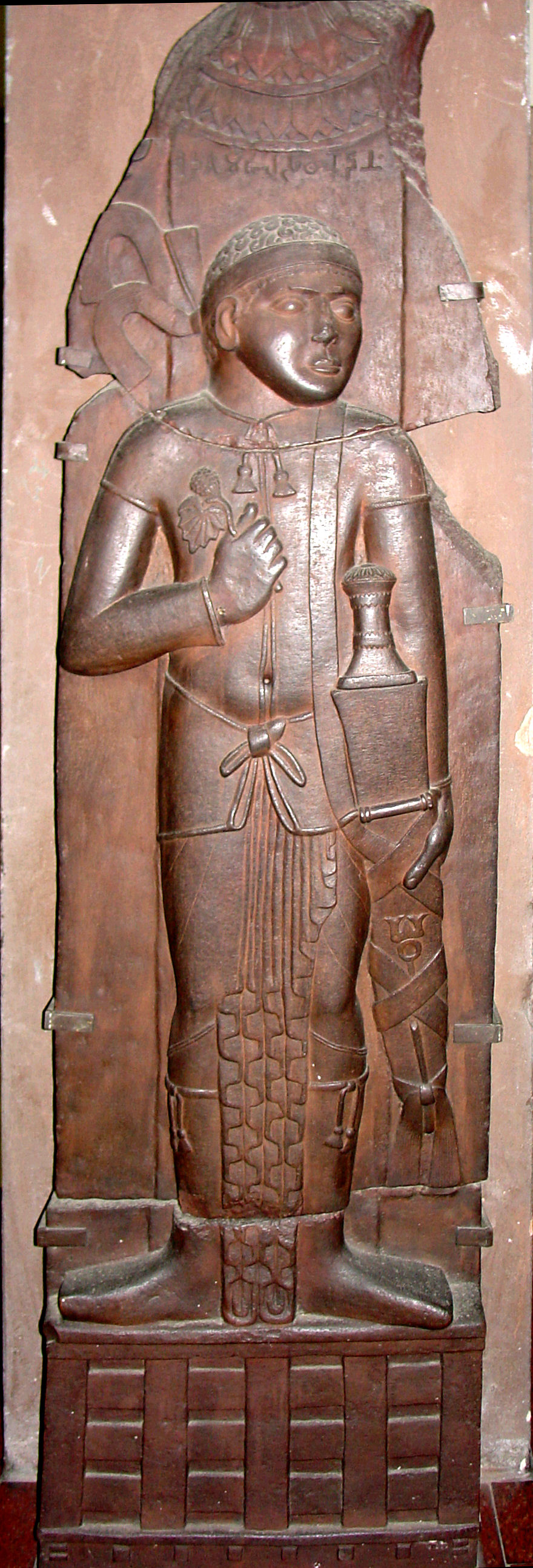
Vedika pillar with "Yavana" Greek warrior. Bharhut, Madhya Pradesh, Shunga Period, c. 100-80 BC. Reddish brown sandstone. Indian Museum, Calcutta.

=== Literary evidence ===
Several works, such as the Mahabharata and the Yuga Purana describe the conflict between the Shungas and the Indo-Greeks.

=== Military expeditions of the Shungas ===
Scriptures such as the Ashokavadana claim that Pushyamitra toppled Emperor Brihadratha and killed many Buddhist monks. Then it describes how Pushyamitra sent an army to Pataliputra and as far as Sakala (Sialkot), in the Punjab, to persecute Buddhist monks.

=== War with the Yavanas (Greeks) ===
The Indo-Greeks, called Yavanas in Indian sources, either led by Demetrius I or Menander I, then invaded India, possibly receiving the help of Buddhists. Menander in particular is described as a convert to Buddhism in the Milindapanha.

The Hindu text of the Yuga Purana, which describes Indian historical events in the form of a prophecy, (Note: Formerly, scholars doubted the validity of the Yuga Purana, because manuscripts of it have been highly corrupted over its history; however, Sanskrit scholar Ludo Rocher says that recent "research has [...] been concerned with establishing a more acceptable text," and "The Yuga [Purana] is important primarily as a historical document. It is a matter-of-fact chronicle [...] of the Magadha empire, down to the breakdown of the Sungas and the arrival of the Sakas. It is unique in its description of the invasion and retirement of the Yavanas in Magadha.") relates the attack of the Indo-Greeks on the Shunga capital Pataliputra, a magnificent fortified city with 570 towers and 64 gates according to Megasthenes, and describes the impending war for city:

Then, after having approached Saketa together with the Panchalas and the Mathuras, the Yavanas, valiant in battle, will reach Kusumadhvaja "the town of the flower-standard", Pataliputra. Then, once Puspapura (another name of Pataliputra) has been reached and its celebrated mud-walls cast down, all the realm will be in disorder

— Yuga Purana, Paragraph 47–48, 2002 edition)

However, the Yuga Purana indicates that the Yavanas (Indo-Greeks) did not remain for long in Pataliputra, as they were faced with a civil war in Bactria.

Western sources also suggest that this new offensive of the Greeks into India led them as far as the capital Pataliputra:

Those who came after Alexander went to the Ganges and Pataliputra

— Strabo, 15.698

=== Battle on the Sindhu river ===
An account of a direct battle between the Greeks and the Shunga is also found in the Mālavikāgnimitram, a play by Kālidāsa which describes a battle between a squadron of Greek cavalrymen and Vasumitra, the grandson of Pushyamitra, accompanied by a hundred soldiers on the "Sindhu river", in which the Indians defeated a squadron of Greeks and Pushyamitra successfully completed the Ashvamedha Yagna. This river may be the Indus River in the northwest, but such expansion by the Shungas is unlikely, and it is more probable that the river mentioned in the text is the Sindh River or the Kali Sindh River in the Ganges Basin.

=== Epigraphic and archaeological evidence ===
==== Dhanadeva-Ayodhya inscription ====
Ultimately, Shunga rule seems to have extended to the area of Ayodhya. Shunga inscriptions are known as far as Ayodhya in northern central India; in particular, the Dhanadeva-Ayodhya inscription refers to a local king Dhanadeva, who claimed to be the sixth descendant of Pushyamitra. The inscription also records that Pushyamitra performed two Ashvamedhas (victory sacrifices) in Ayodhya.

==== Yavanarajya inscription ====
The Yavanarajya inscription, dated to "year 116 of Yavana hegemony", probably 70 or 69 BCE, was discovered in Mathura. Mathura Museum.

The Greeks seem to have maintained control of Mathura. The Yavanarajya inscription, also called the "Maghera inscription", discovered in Mathura, suggests that the Indo-Greeks were in control of Mathura during the 1st century BCE. The inscription is important in that it mentions the date of its dedication as "The last day of year 116 of Yavana hegemony (Yavanarajya)". It is considered that this inscription is attesting the control of the Indo-Greeks in the 2nd and 1st centuries BCE in Mathura, a fact that is also confirmed by numismatic and literary evidence. Moreover, it does not seem that the Shungas ever ruled in Mathura or Surasena since no Shunga coins or inscriptions have been found there.

The Anushasana Parva of the Mahabharata affirms that the city of Mathura was under the joint control of the Yavanas and the Kambojas.

Later however, it seems the city of Mathura was retaken from them, if not by the Shungas themselves, then probably by other indigenous rulers such as the Datta dynasty or the Mitra dynasty, or more probably by the Indo-Scythian Northern Satraps under Rajuvula. In the region of Mathura, the Arjunayanas and Yaudheyas mention military victories on their coins ("Victory of the Arjunayanas", "Victory of the Yaudheyas"), and during the 1st century BCE, the Trigartas, Audumbaras and finally the Kunindas also started to mint their own coins, thus affirming independence from the Indo-Greeks, although the style of their coins was often derived from that of the Indo-Greeks.

==== Heliodorus pillar ====
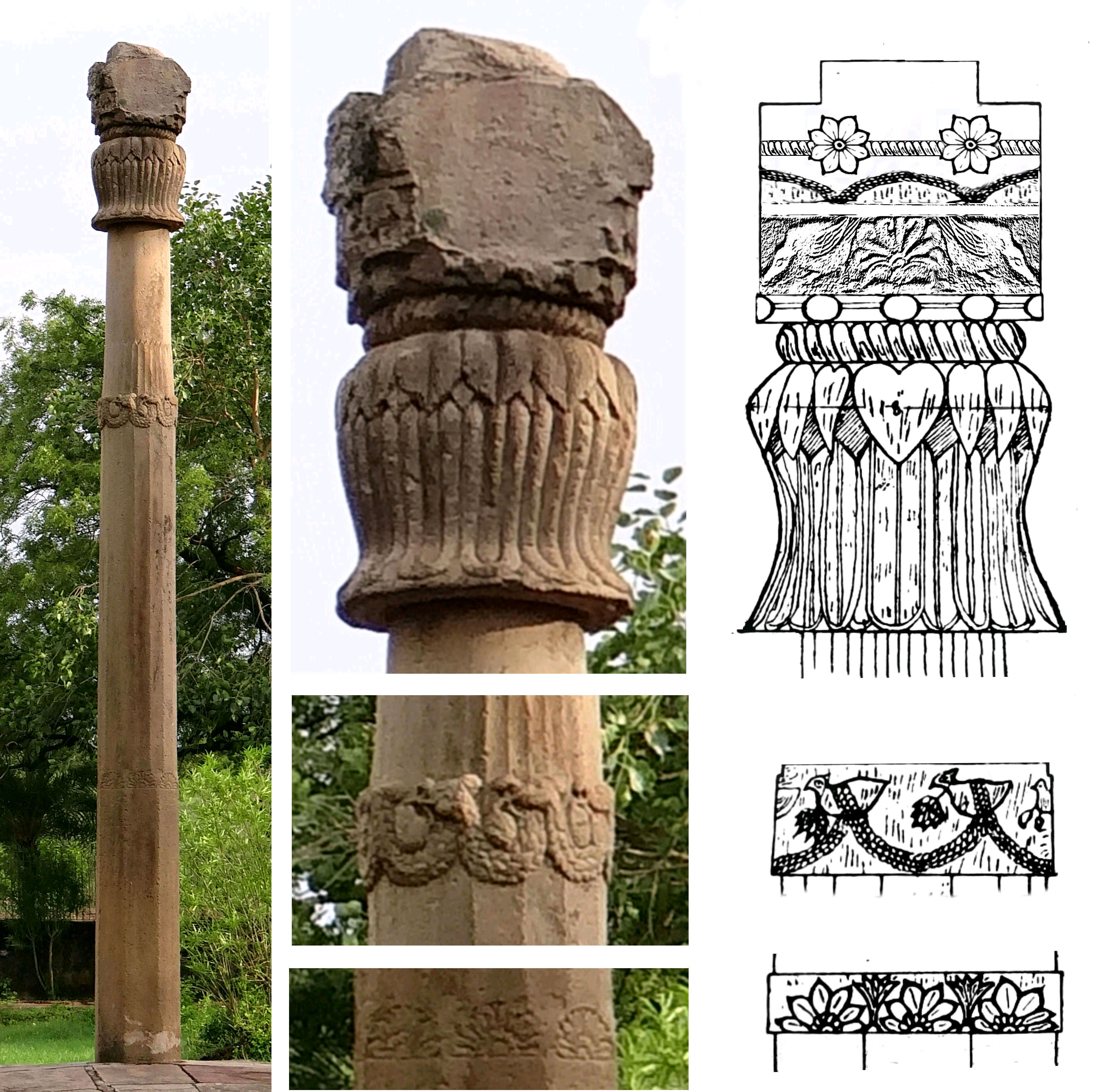
The Heliodorus pillar was built in Vidisha under the Shungas, at the instigation of Heliodorus, ambassador of the Indo-Greek king Antialcidas. The pillar originally supported a statue of Garuda. Established circa 100 BCE.

Very little can be said with great certainty. However, what does appear clear is that the two realms appeared to have established normalised diplomatic relations in the succeeding reigns of their respective rulers. The Indo-Greeks and the Shungas seem to have reconciled and exchanged diplomatic missions around 110 BCE, as indicated by the Heliodorus pillar, which records the dispatch of a Greek ambassador named Heliodorus, from the court of the Indo-Greek king Antialcidas, to the court of the Shunga emperor Bhagabhadra at the site of Vidisha in central India.

== Decline ==
After the death of Agnimitra, the second king of the dynasty, the empire rapidly disintegrated: inscriptions and coins indicate that much of northern and central India consisted of small kingdoms and city-states that were independent of any Shunga hegemony.

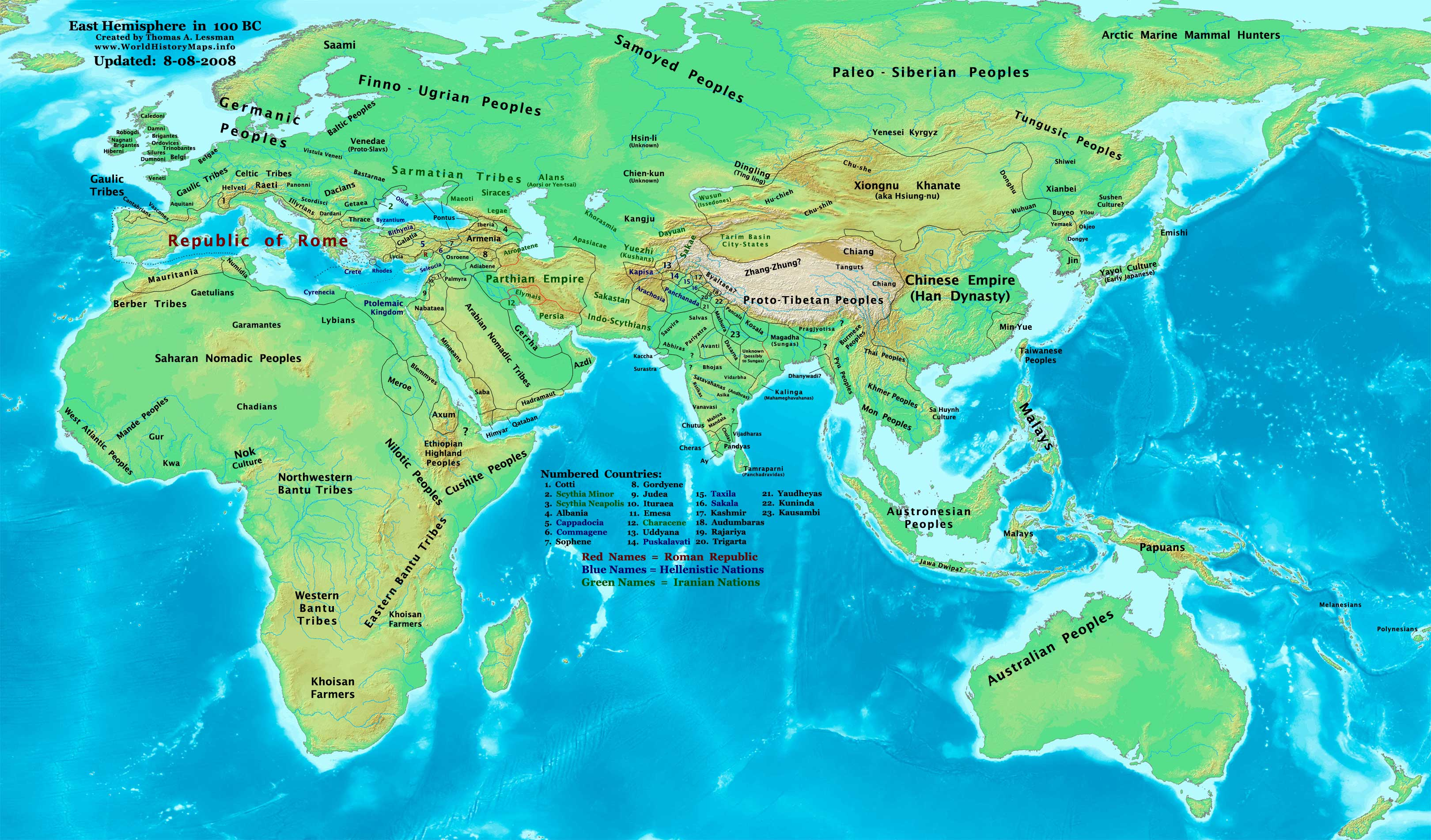
The Sunga territory circa 100 BCE, greatly reduced to the region of Magadha only, with many independent, petty kingdoms such as such as Mathura and Panchala

The last king of Sungas, Devabhuti was assassinated by his minister Vasudeva Kanva, who then established Kanva dynasty. According to the Puranas: "The Andhra Simuka will assail the Kanvayanas and Susarman, and destroy the remains of the Sungas' power and will obtain this earth." The Andhras did indeed destroy the last remains of the Sunga state in central India somewhere around Vidisha, probably as a feeble rump state.

== Art ==
The Shunga art style differed somewhat from imperial Mauryan art, which was influenced by Persian art. In both, continuing elements of folk art and cults of the Mother goddess appear in popular art, but are now produced with more skill in more monumental forms. The Shunga style was thus seen as 'more Indian' and is often described as the more indigenous.

Art, education, philosophy, and other learning flowered during this period. Most notably, Patanjali's Yoga Sutras and Mahabhashya were composed in this period. It is also noted for its subsequent mention in the Malavikaagnimitra. This work was composed by Kalidasa in the later Gupta period, and romanticised the love of Malavika and King Agnimitra, with a background of court intrigue.

Artistry on the subcontinent also progressed with the rise of the Mathura school, which is considered the indigenous counterpart to the more Hellenistic Gandhara school (Greco-Buddhist art) of Afghanistan and North-Western frontier of India (modern day Pakistan).

During the historical Shunga period (185 to 73 BCE), Buddhist activity also managed to survive somewhat in central India (Madhya Pradesh) as suggested by some architectural expansions that were done at the stupas of Sanchi and Bharhut, originally started under Emperor Ashoka. It remains uncertain whether these works were due to the weakness of the control of the Shungas in these areas, or a sign of tolerance on their part.

Shunga statuettes and reliefs
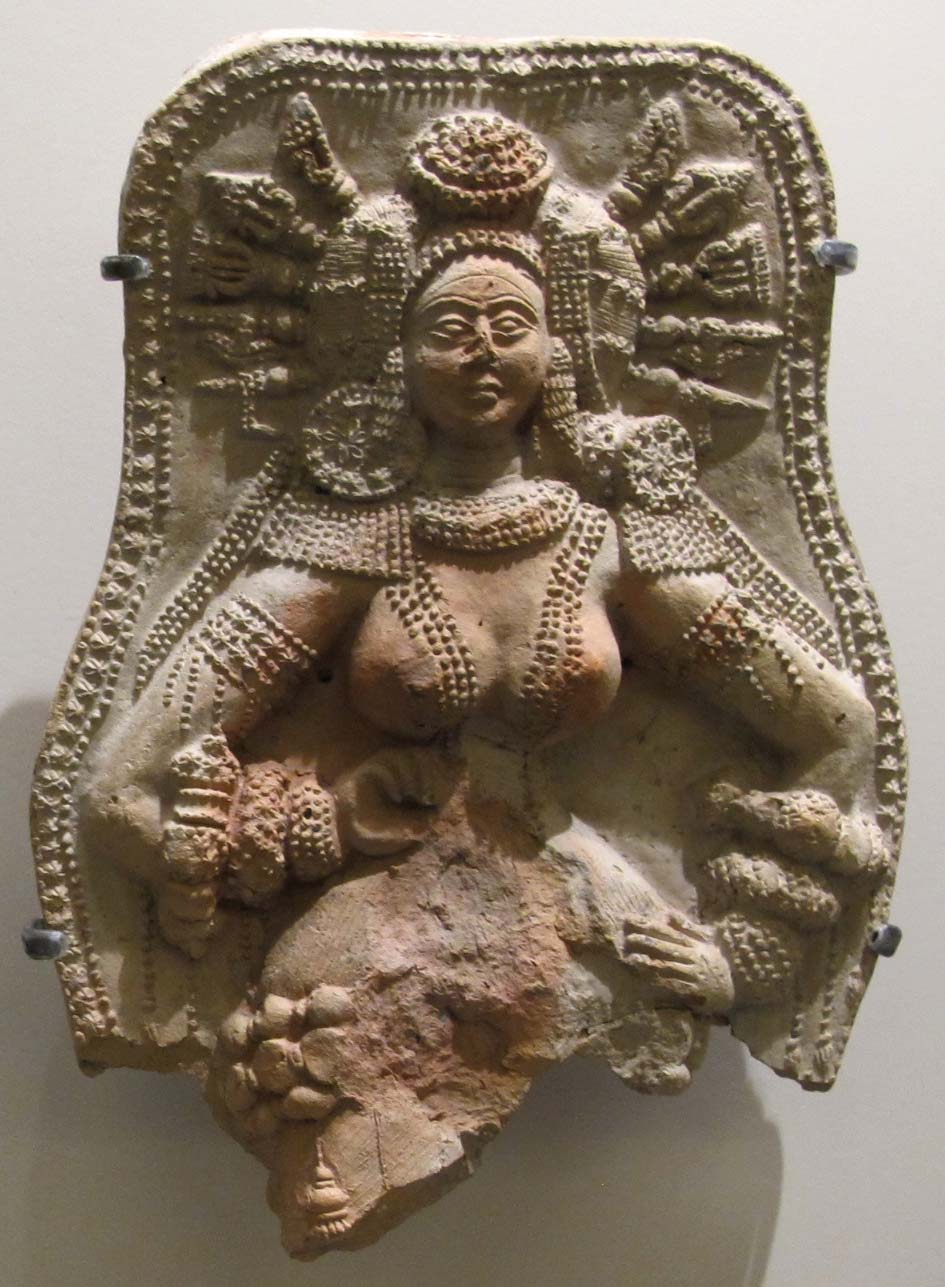
Chandraketugarth, goddess of fecundity.

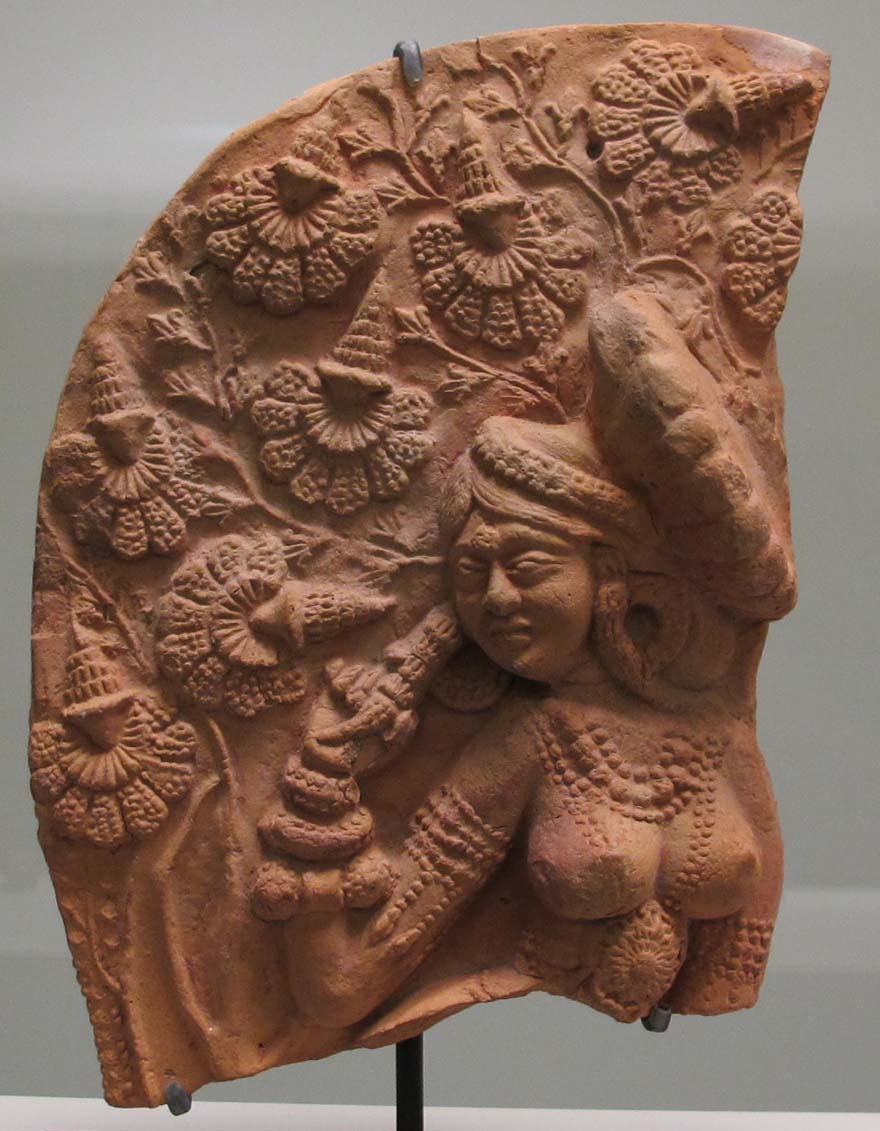
Chandraketugarth.

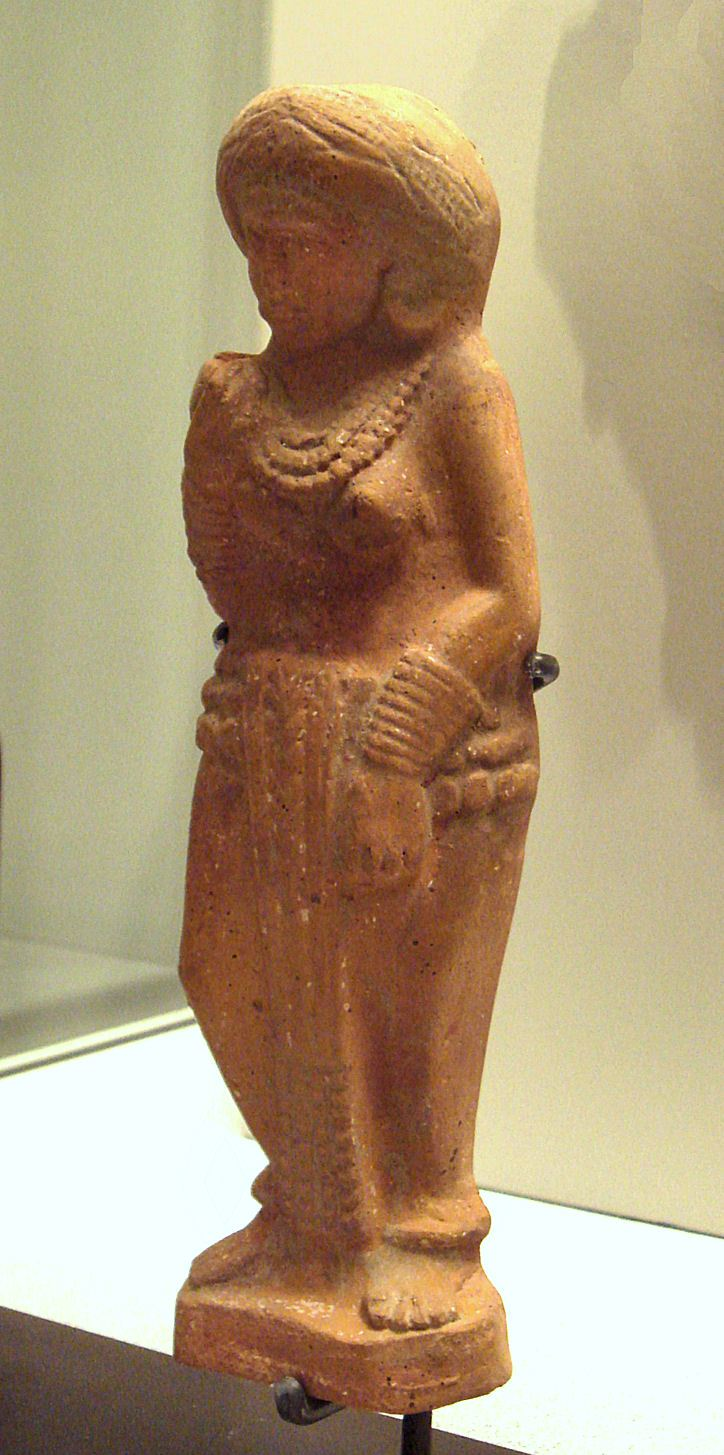
Shunga Yakshi, 2nd–1st century BCE.

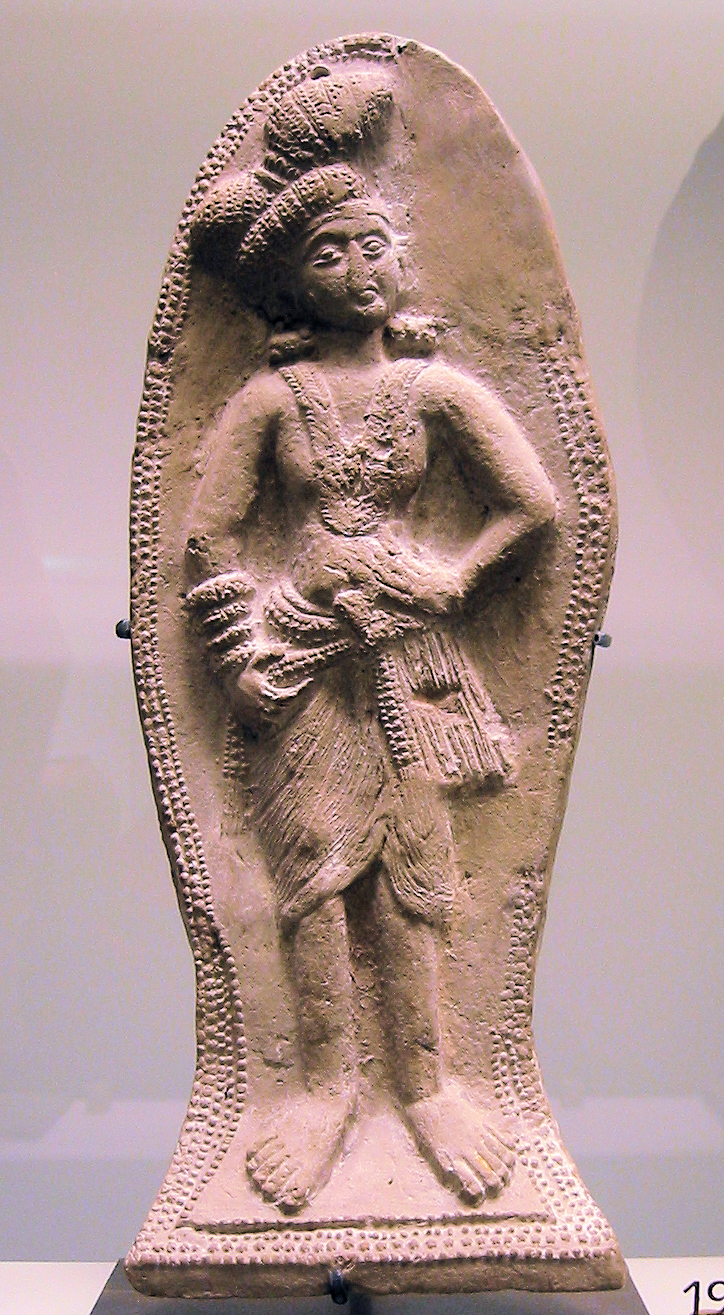
Shunga masculine figurine (molded plate). 2nd–1st century BCE.

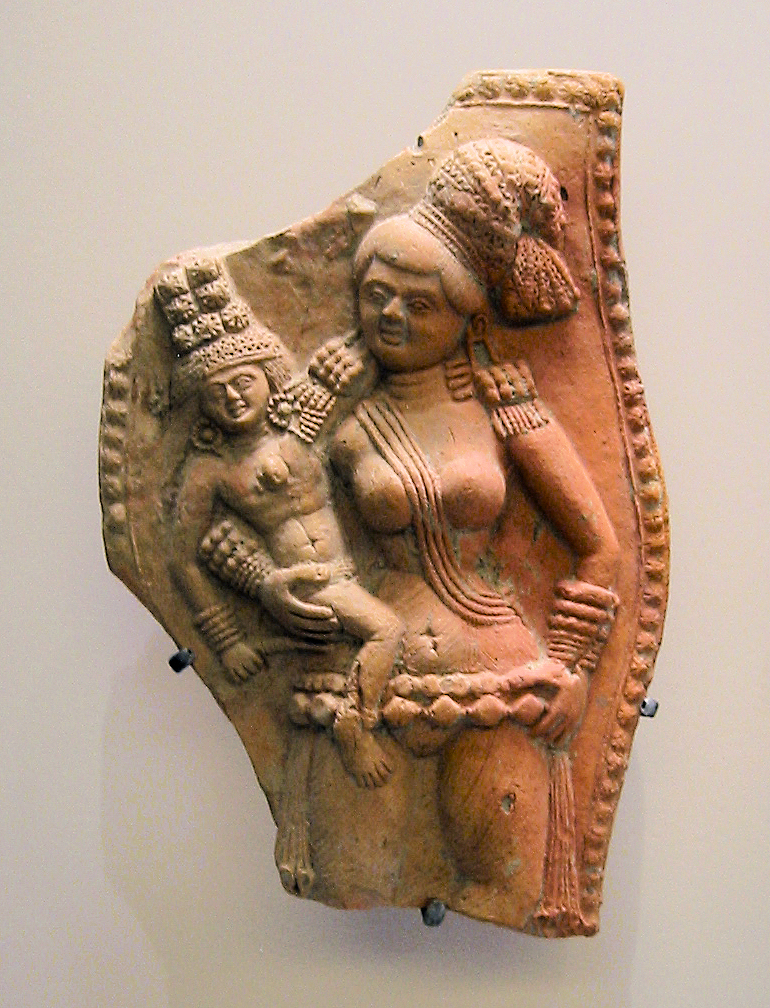
Shunga woman with child. 2nd–1st century BCE.

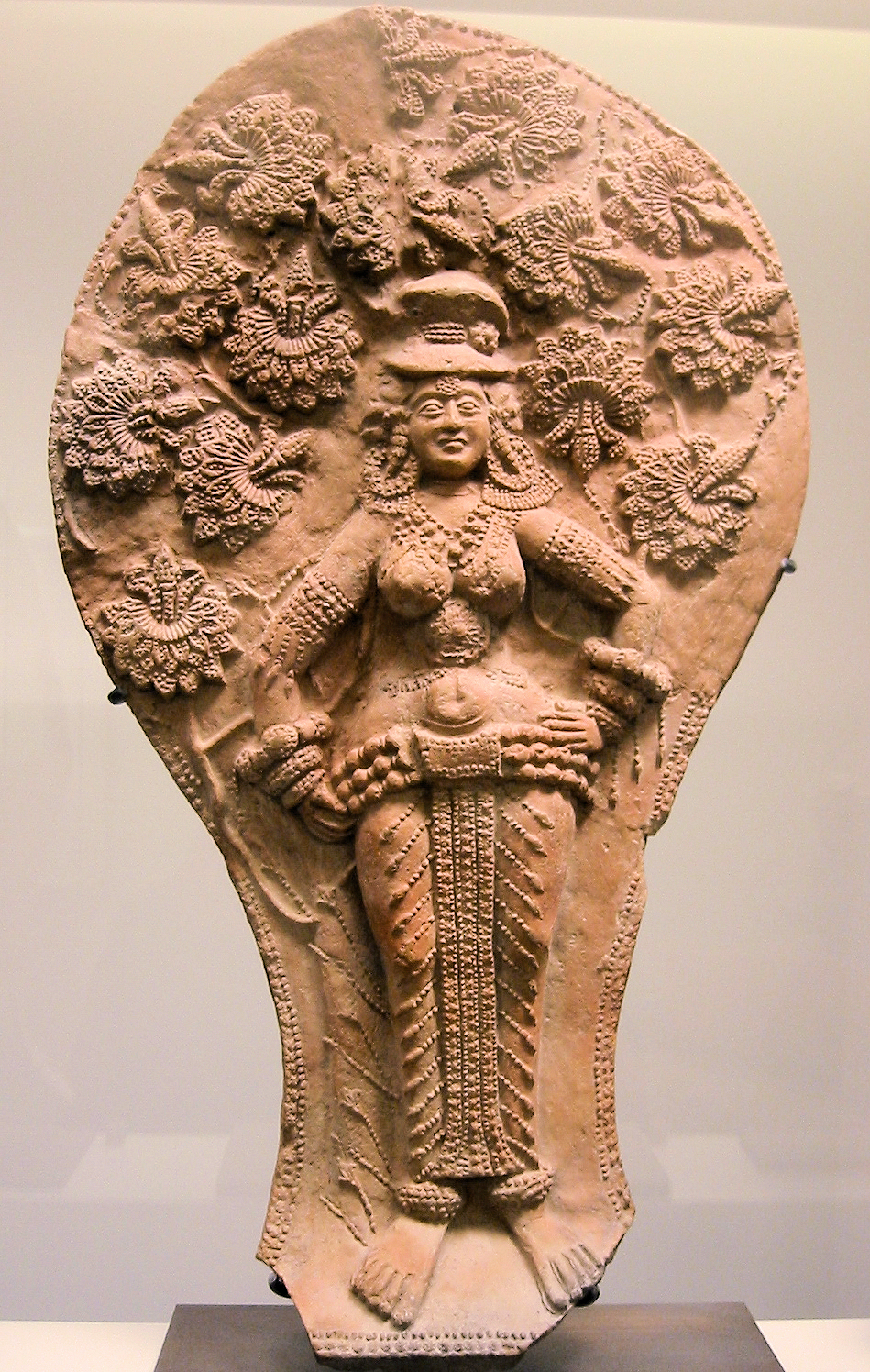
Shunga Yaksha. 2nd–1st century BCE.

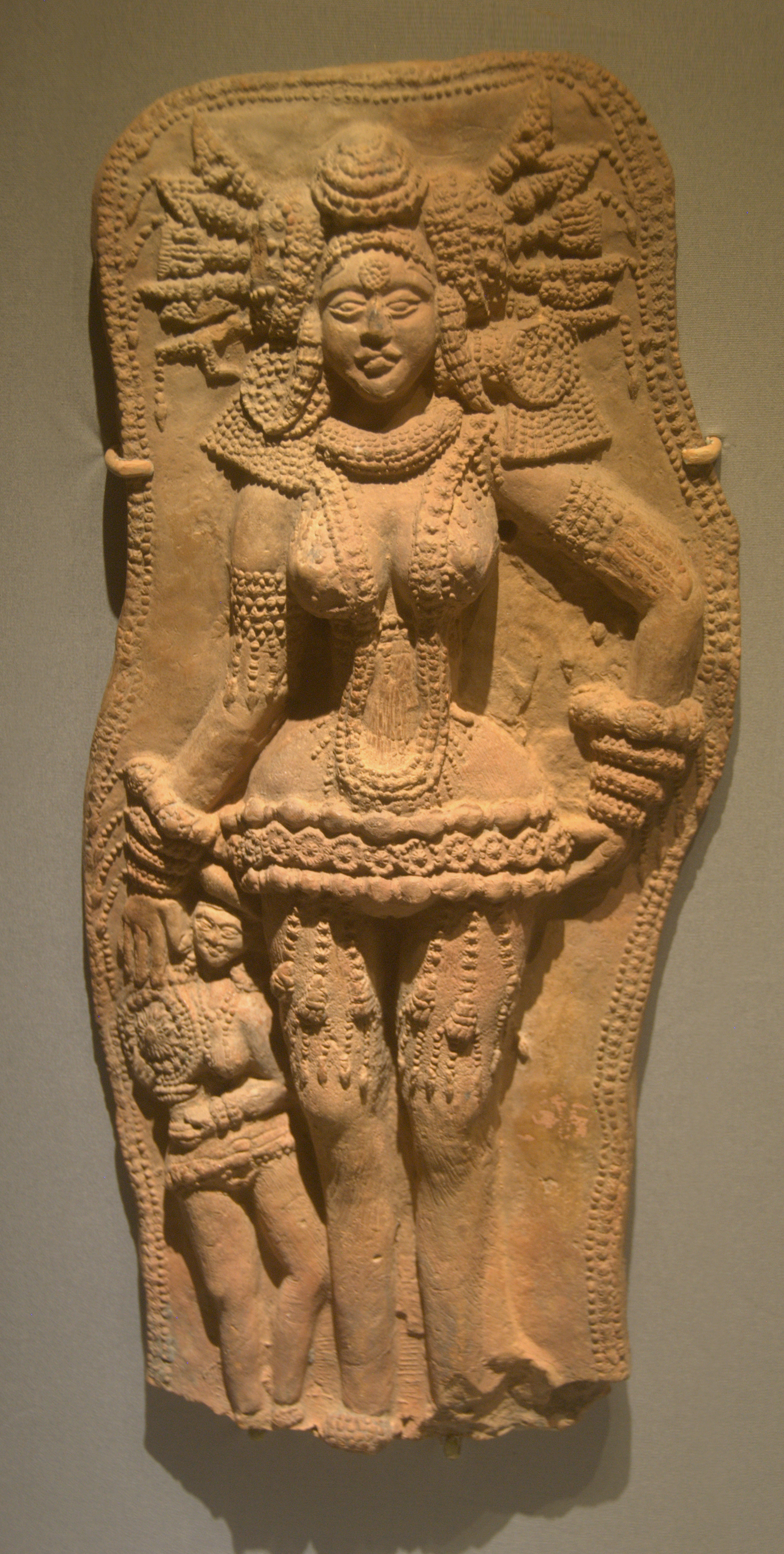
Shunga mother figure, with attendant. 2nd–1st century BCE.

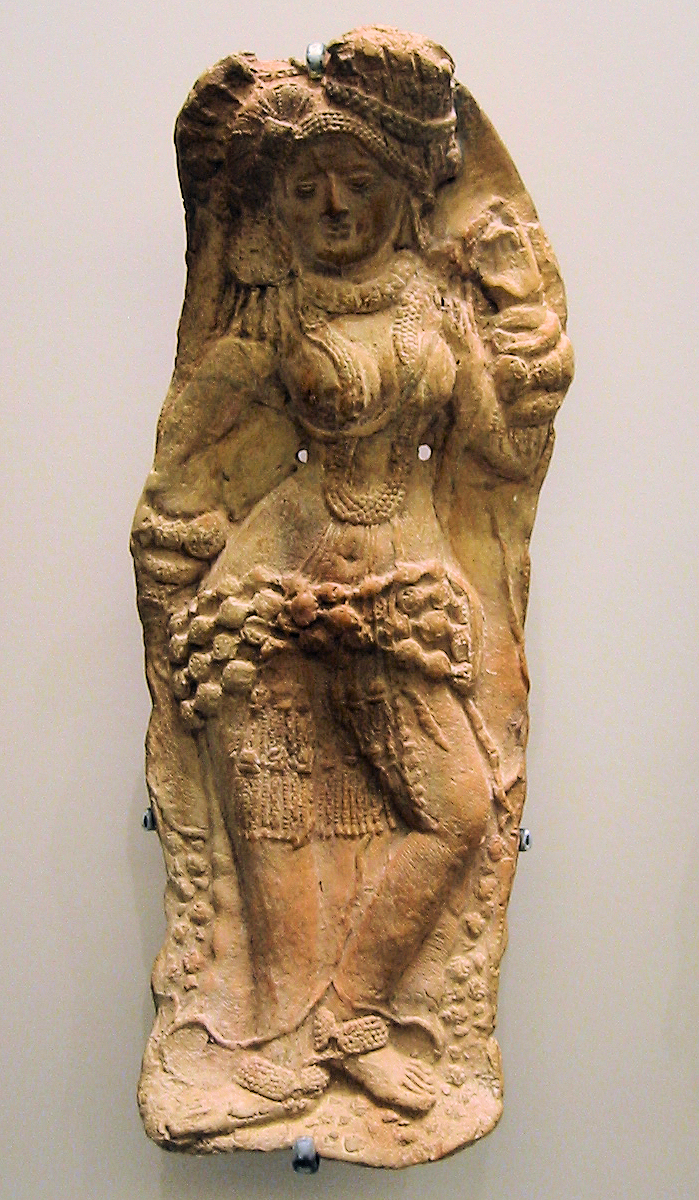
Shunga fecundity deity. 2nd–1st century BCE.

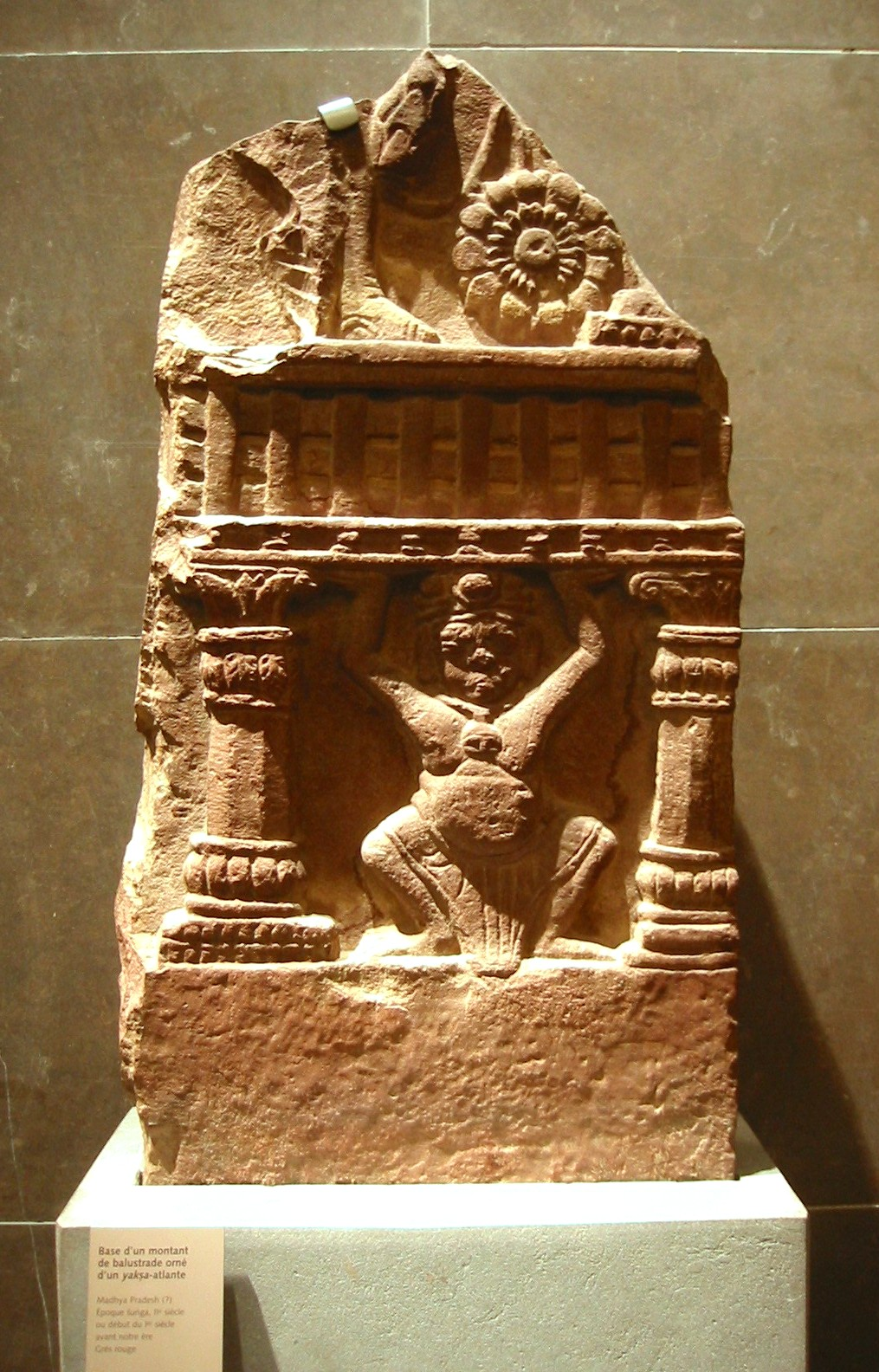
Baluster-holding yakṣa, Madhya Pradesh, Shunga period (2nd–1st century BCE). Guimet Museum.

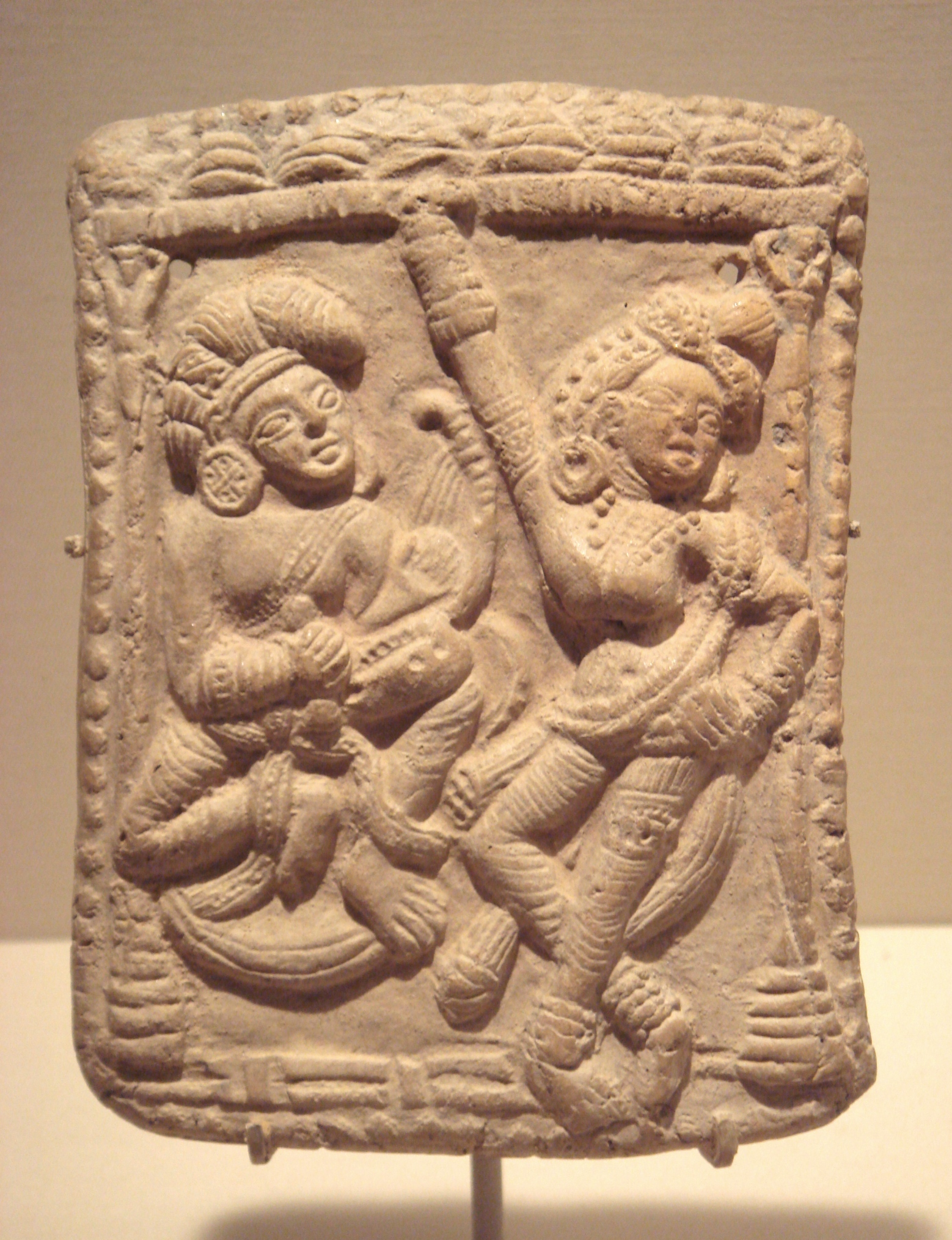
Royal family, Shunga, West Bengal 1st century BCE.

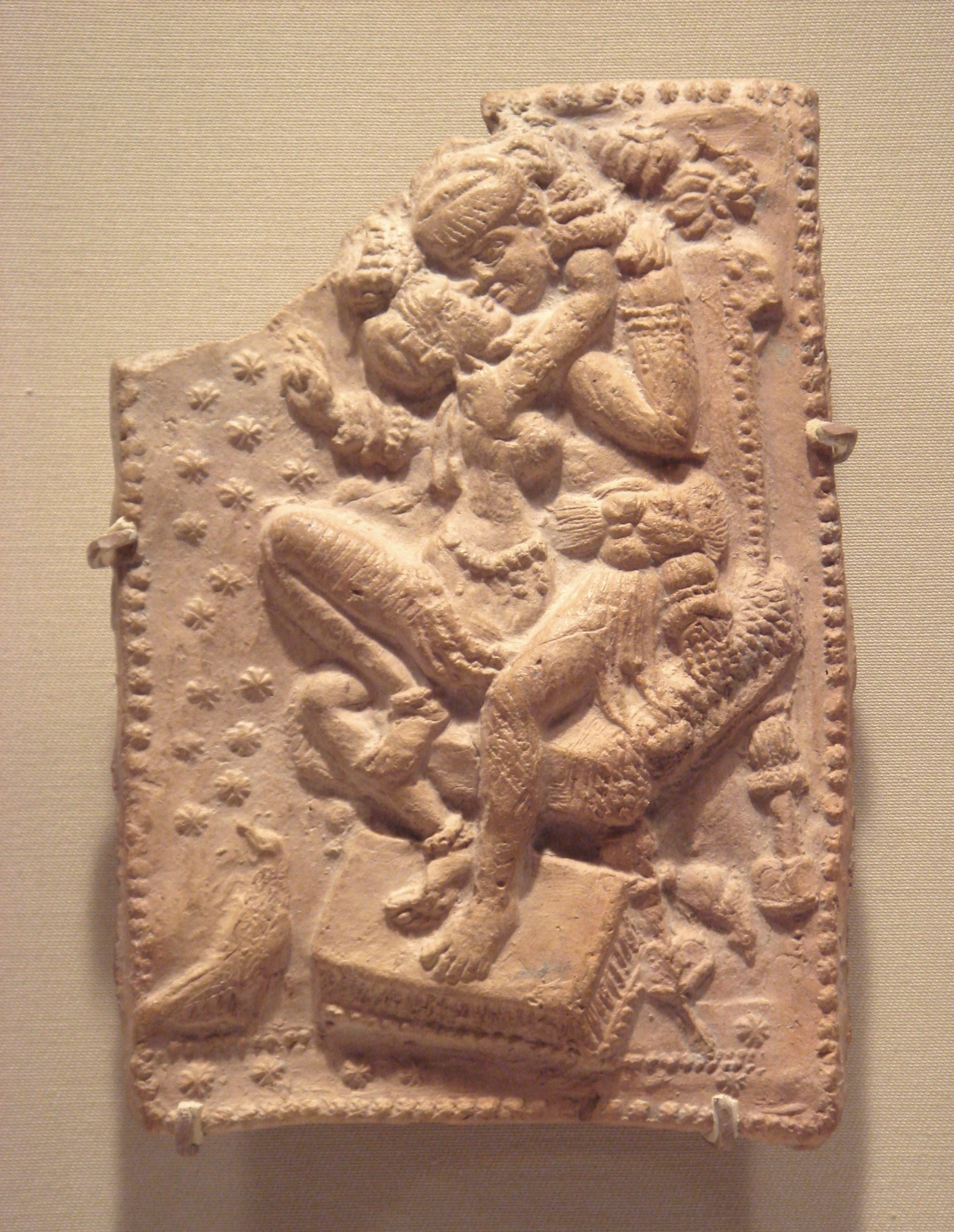
Amorous royal couple. Shunga, 1st century BCE, West Bengal.

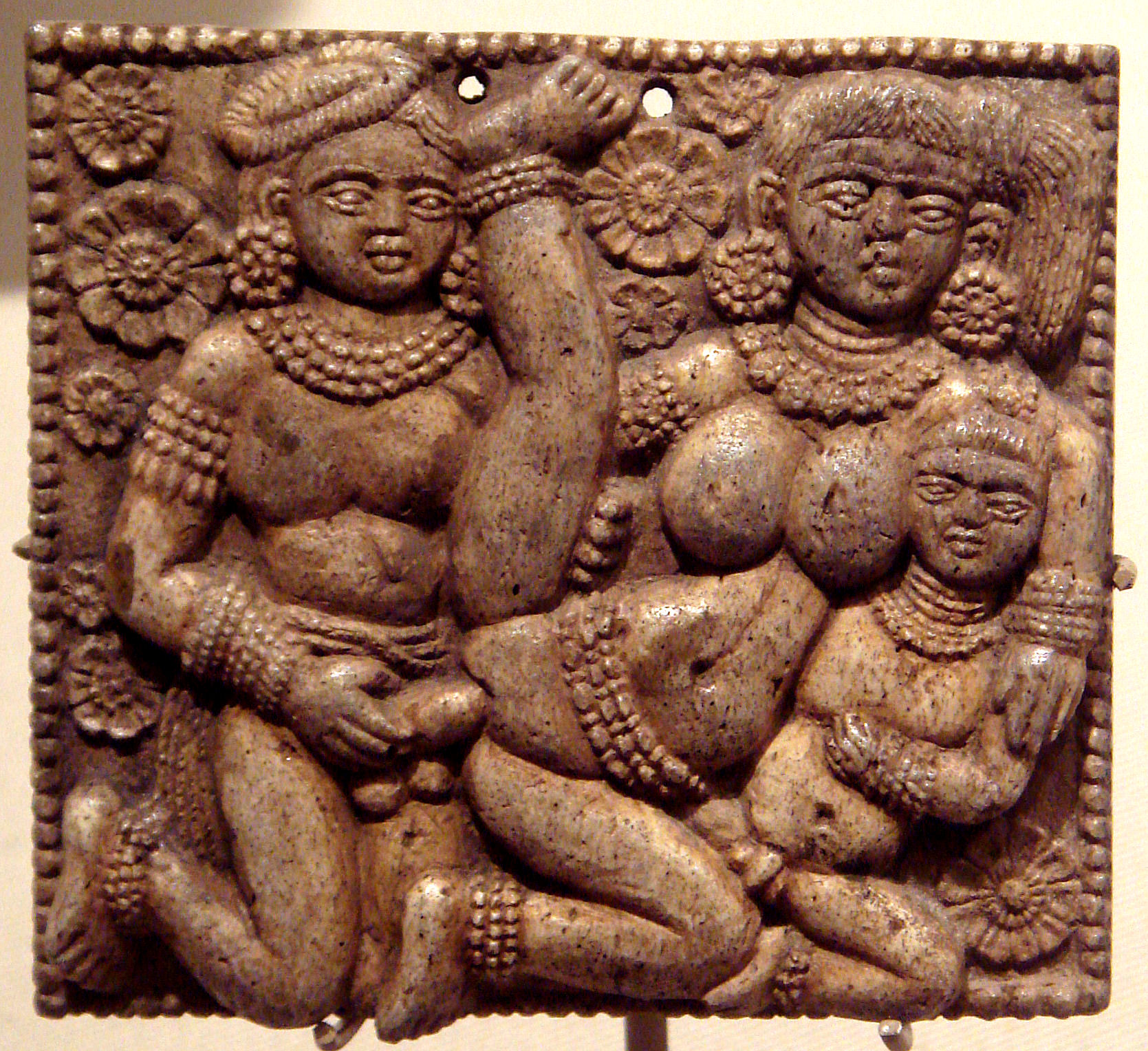
Erotic art from Shunga period.

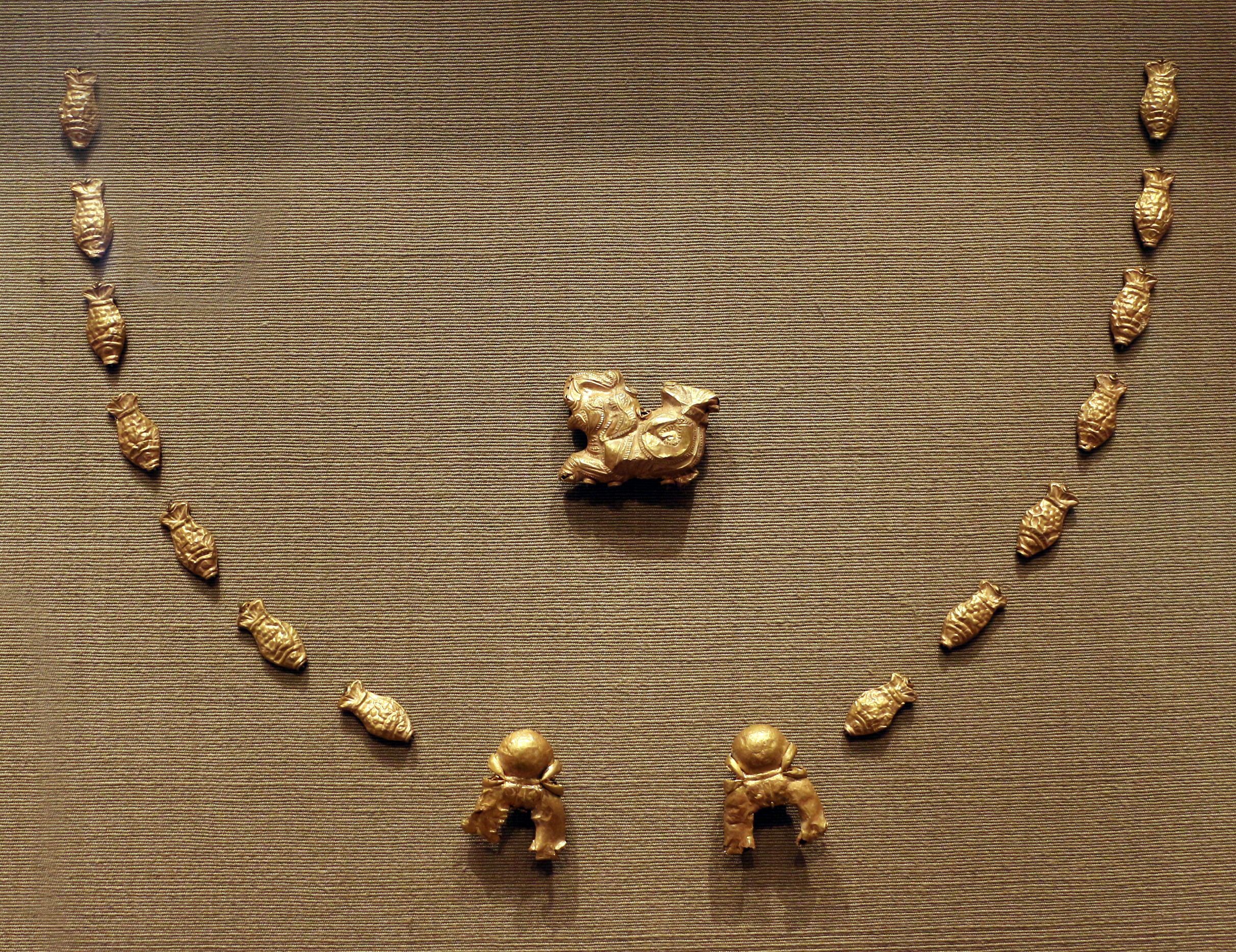
Fragments of gold ornament, 185-72 BCE.

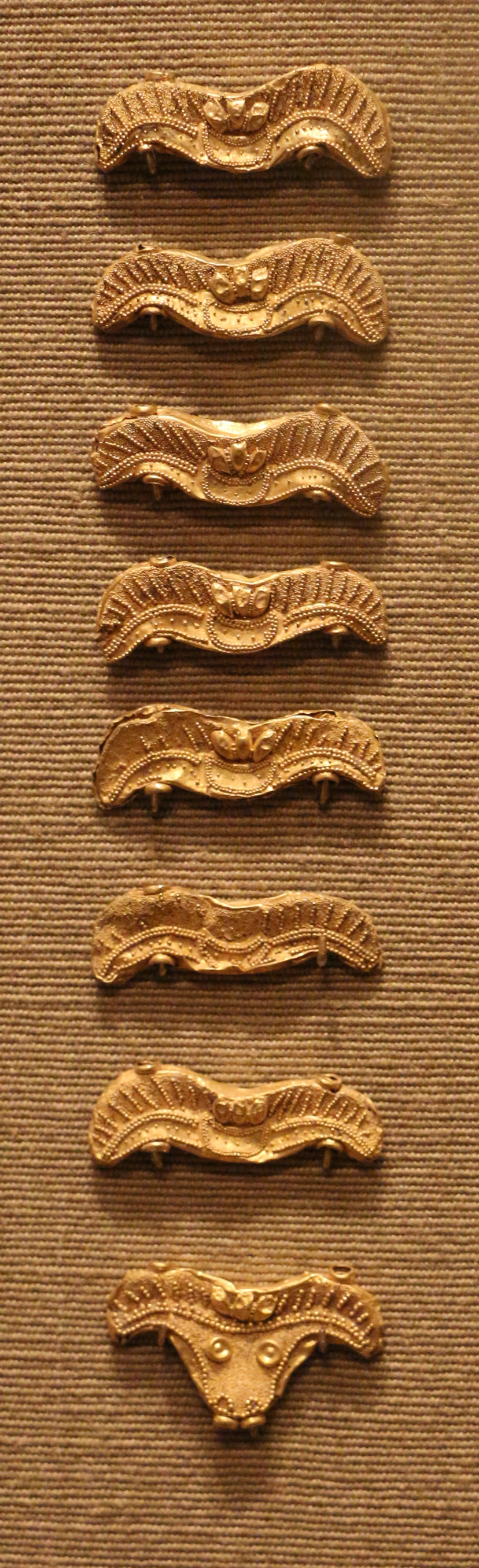
Fragments of gold ornament, 185-72 BCE.

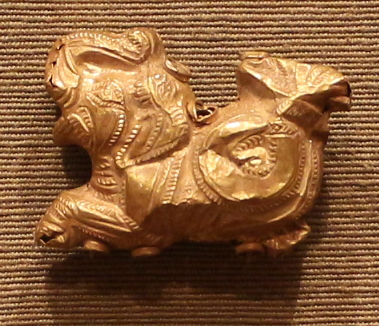
Fragment of gold ornament, 185-72 BCE.

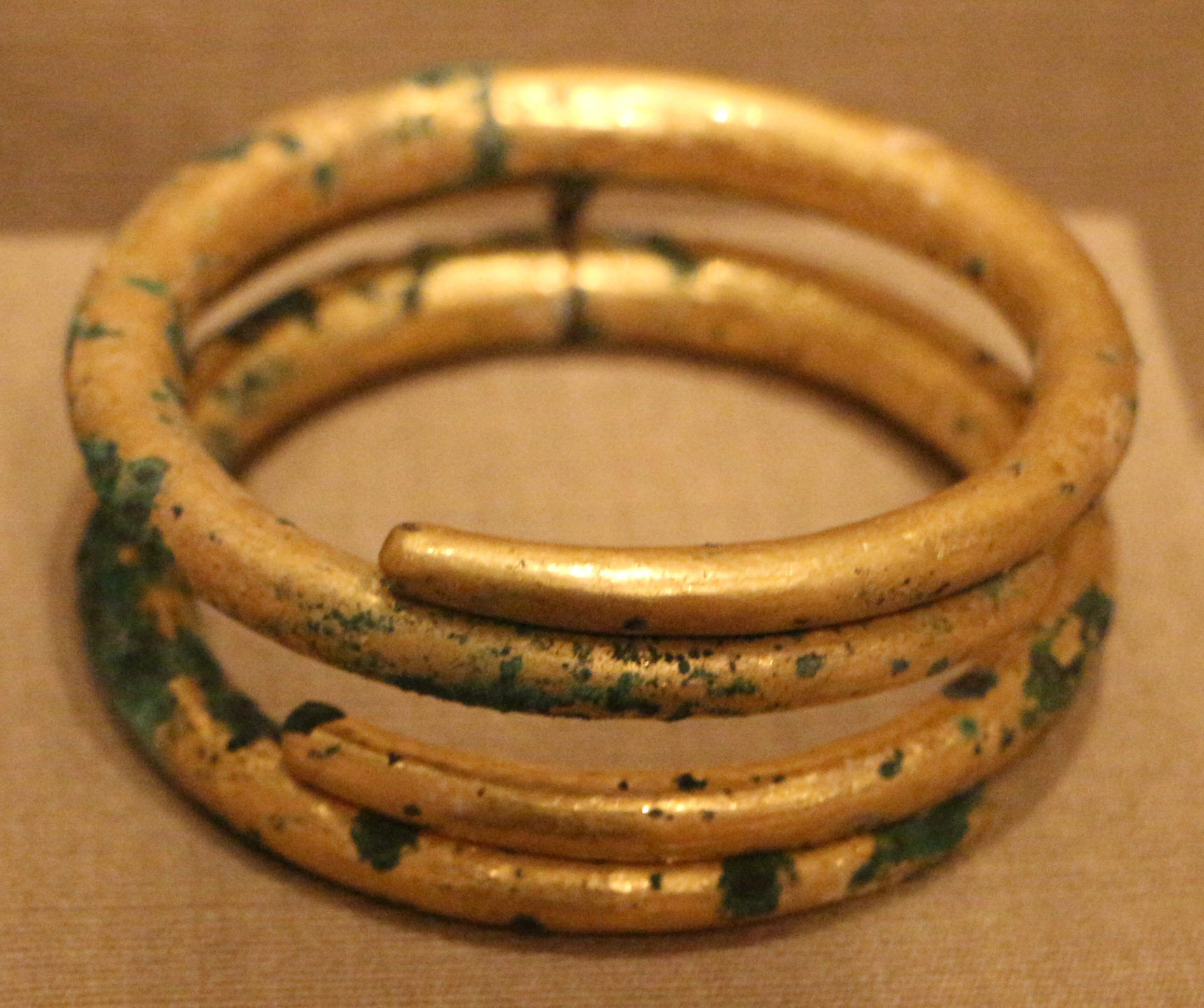
Gold bracelet from Shunga period, 185-72 BCE.

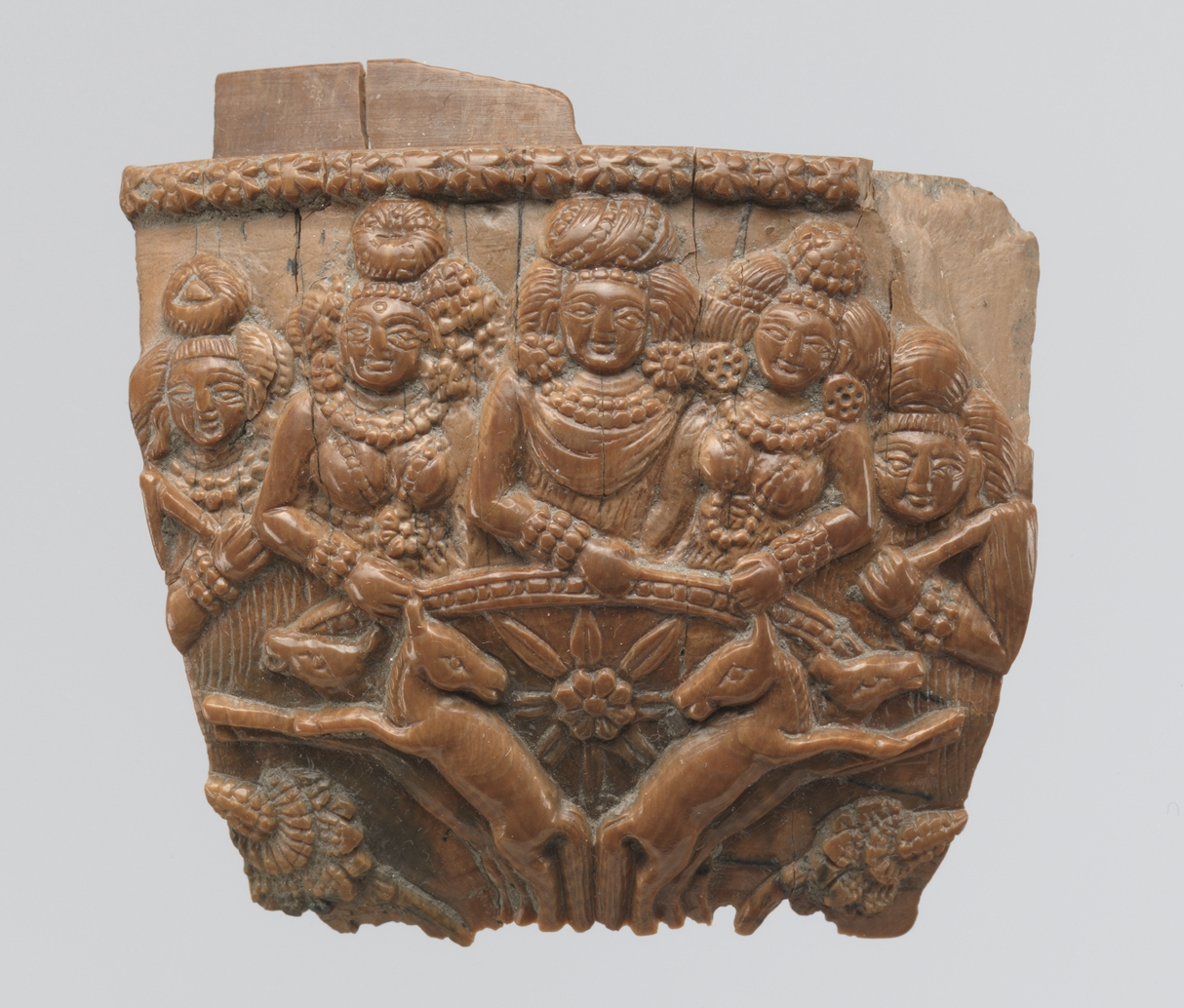
Ivory bowl fragment, 2nd–1st century B.C.

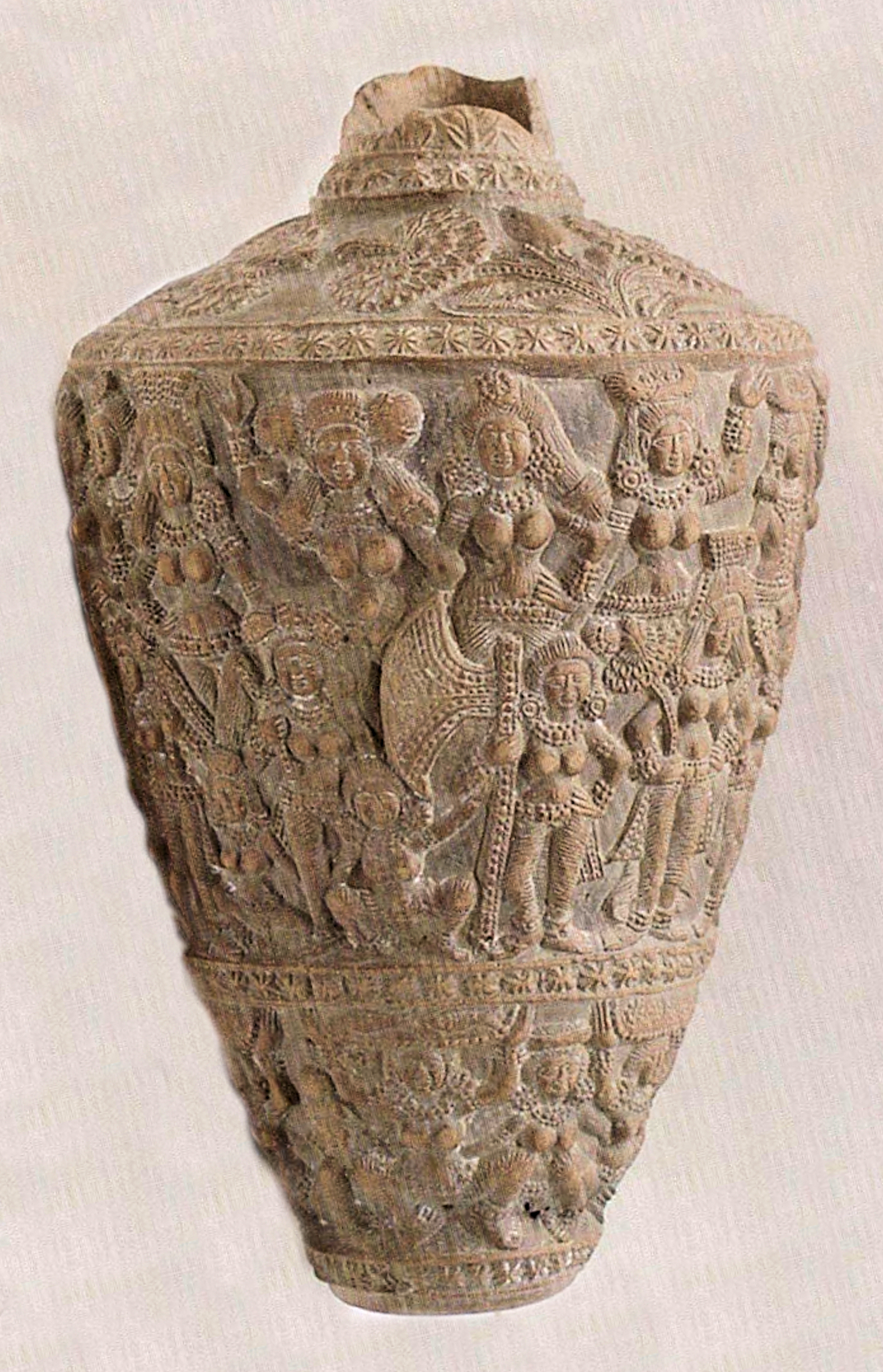
Shunga pottery with decorative figurine motifes.

== Script ==
The script used by the Shunga was a variant of Brahmi, and was used to write the Sanskrit language. The script is thought to be an intermediary between the Maurya and the Kalinga Brahmi scripts.

Shunga coinage
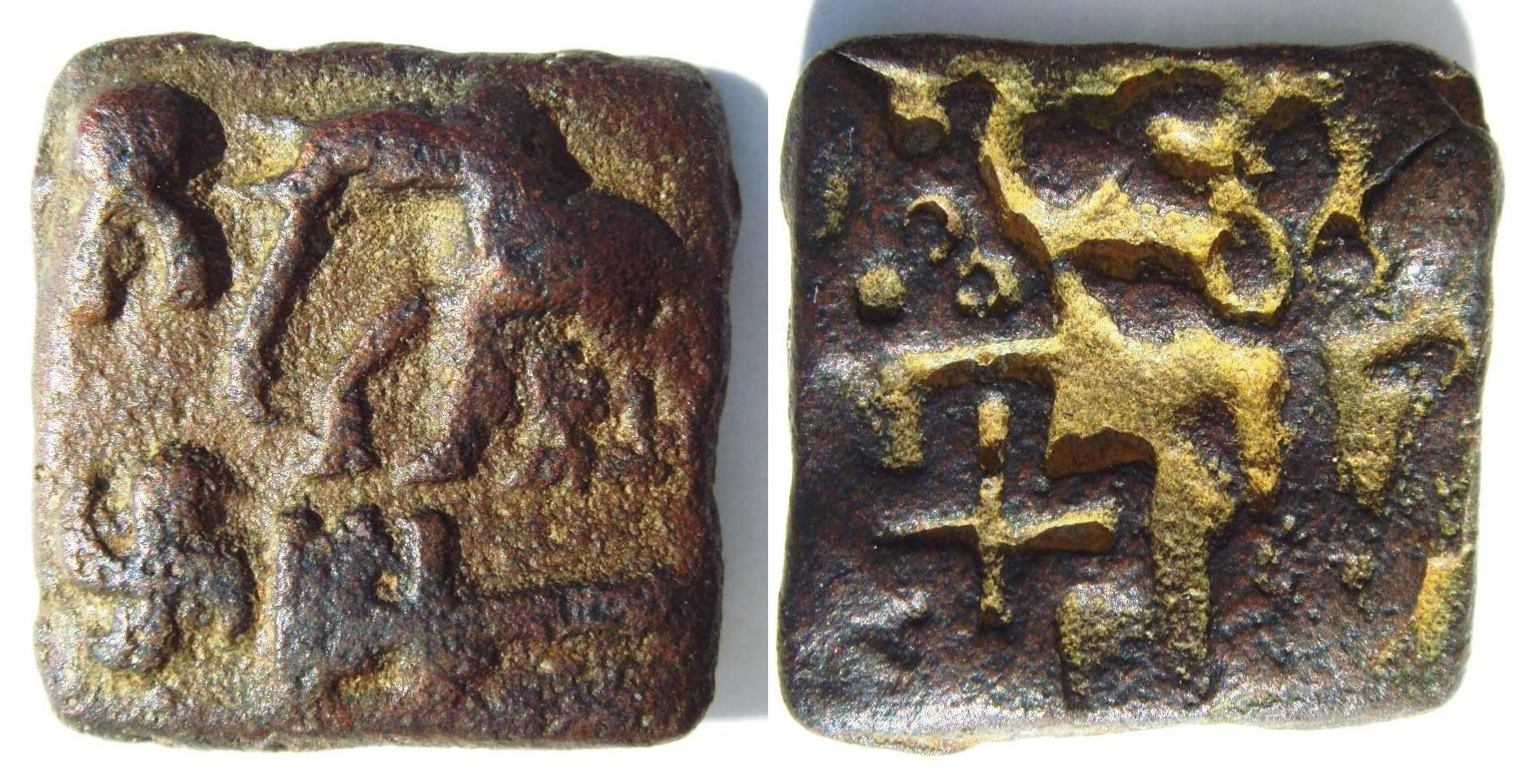
Bronze coin of the Shunga period, Eastern India. 2nd–1st century BCE.

Another Shunga coin

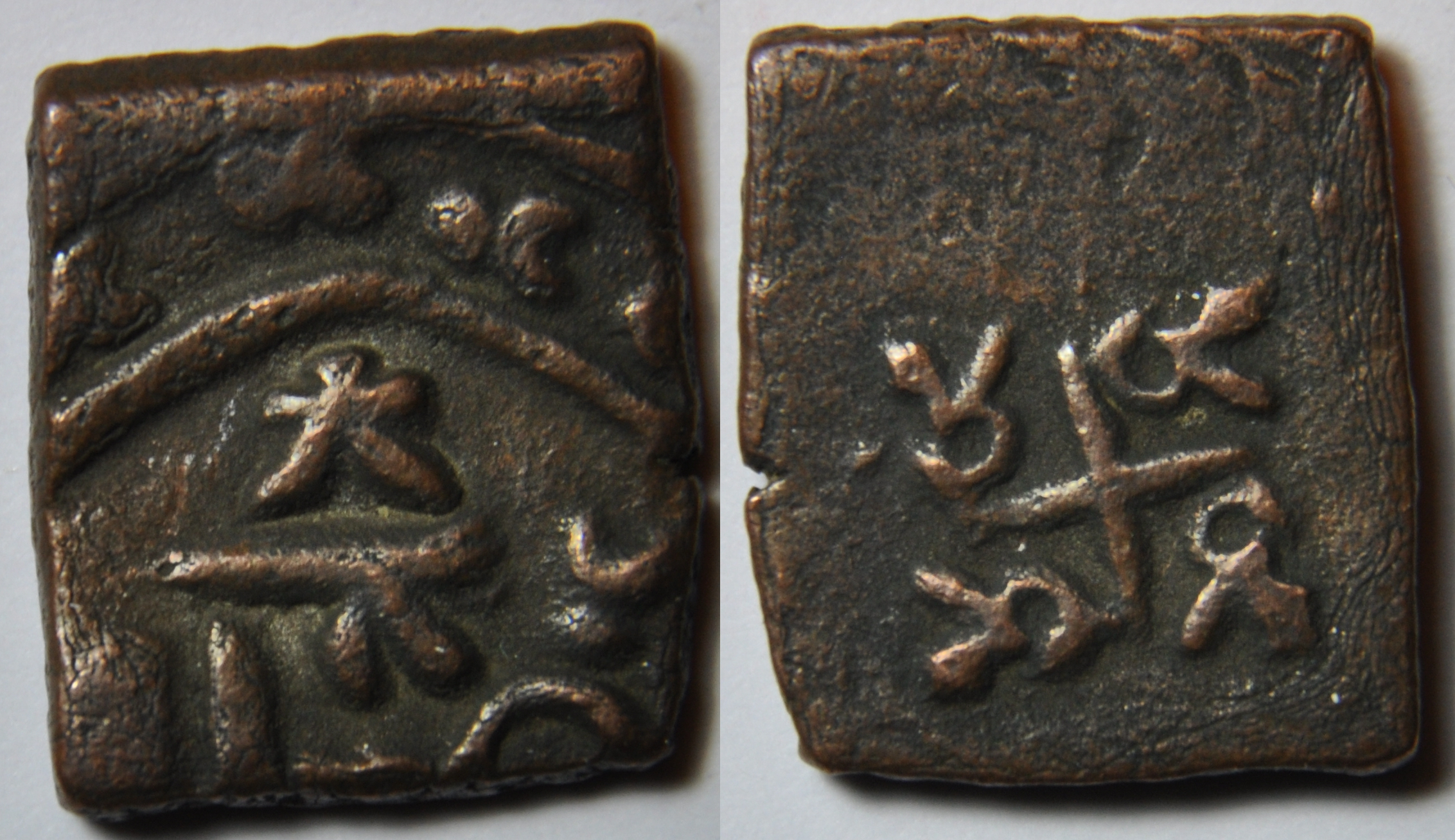
A copper coin of 1/4 karshapana of Ujjain in Malwa.

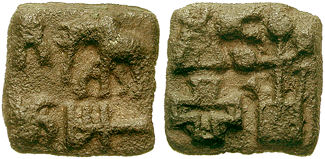
Shunga coin.

== List of Shunga emperors ==
| Emperor | Reign |
|---|---|
| Pushyamitra | 185–149 BCE |
| Agnimitra | 149–141 BCE |
| Vasujyeshtha | 141–131 BCE |
| Vasumitra | 131–124 BCE |
| Bhadraka | 124–122 BCE |
| Pulindaka | 122–119 BCE |
| Ghosha or Vajramitra | 119–114 BCE |
| Bhagabhadra | 114–83 BCE |
| Devabhuti | 83–73 BCE |

== See also ==
- History of India
- History of Hinduism

== Notes ==
| Preceded by Maurya dynasty | Magadha dynasties | Succeeded by Kanva dynasty |

| Timeline and cultural period | Indus plain (Punjab-Sapta Sindhu-Gujarat) | Gangetic Plain | | | Central India | Southern India |
| Timeline and cultural period | Indus plain (Punjab-Sapta Sindhu-Gujarat) | Upper Gangetic Plain (Ganga-Yamuna doab) | Middle Gangetic Plain | Lower Gangetic Plain | Central India | Southern India |
IRON AGE
| Culture | Late Vedic Period | Late Vedic Period; Painted Grey Ware culture | Late Vedic Period; Northern Black Polished Ware | | Pre-history | |
| 6th century BCE | Gandhara | Kuru-Panchala | Magadha | | Adivasi (tribes) | Assaka |
| Culture | Persian-Greek influences | "Second Urbanisation"; Rise of Shramana movements Jainism - Buddhism - Ājīvika - Yoga | | | Pre-history | |
| 5th century BCE | (Persian conquests) | | Shaishunaga dynasty | | Adivasi (tribes) | Assaka |
| 4th century BCE | (Greek conquests) | Nanda empire | | | | |
HISTORICAL AGE
| Culture | Spread of Buddhism | | | | Pre-history | |
| 3rd century BCE | Maurya Empire | | | | | Satavahana dynasty Sangam period (300 BCE – 200 CE); Early Cholas; Early Pandyan kingdom Cheras |
| Culture | Preclassical Hinduism (Note: Michaels (2004) p.39) - "Hindu Synthesis" (Note: Hiltebeitel (2002)) (ca. 200 BCE - 300 CE) (Note: Michaels (2004) p.39) (Note: Hiltebeitel (2002)); Epics - Puranas - Ramayana - Mahabharata - Bhagavad Gita - Brahma Sutras - Smarta Tradition; Mahayana Buddhism | | | | | |
| 2nd century BCE | Indo-Greek Kingdom | | Shunga Empire; Maha-Meghavahana Dynasty | | | Satavahana dynasty Sangam period (300 BCE – 200 CE); Early Cholas; Early Pandyan kingdom Cheras |
| 1st century BCE | Indo-Greek Kingdom | | Shunga Empire; Maha-Meghavahana Dynasty | | | Satavahana dynasty Sangam period (300 BCE – 200 CE); Early Cholas; Early Pandyan kingdom Cheras |
| 1st century CE | Indo-Scythians; Indo-Parthians | | Kuninda Kingdom | | | Satavahana dynasty Sangam period (300 BCE – 200 CE); Early Cholas; Early Pandyan kingdom Cheras |
| 2nd century | Kushan Empire | | | | | Satavahana dynasty Sangam period (300 BCE – 200 CE); Early Cholas; Early Pandyan kingdom Cheras |
| 3rd century | Kushano-Sasanian Kingdom; Western Satraps | Kushan Empire | | Kamarupa kingdom | Adivasi (tribes) | Satavahana dynasty Sangam period (300 BCE – 200 CE); Early Cholas; Early Pandyan kingdom Cheras |
| Culture | "Golden Age of Hinduism"(ca. CE 320-650) (Note: Michaels (2004) p.40); Puranas - Kural; Co-existence of Hinduism and Buddhism | | | | | |
| 4th century | Kidarites | Gupta Empire; Varman dynasty | | | | Andhra Ikshvakus; Kalabhra dynasty Kadamba Dynasty; Western Ganga Dynasty |
| 5th century | Hephthalite Empire | Alchon Huns | | | | Vishnukundina; Kalabhra dynasty |
| 6th century | Nezak Huns; Kabul Shahi; Maitraka | | | | Adivasi (tribes) | Vishnukundina; Badami Chalukyas; Kalabhra dynasty |
| Culture | Late-Classical Hinduism (ca. CE 650-1100) (Note: Michaels (2004) p.41); Advaita Vedanta - Tantra; Decline of Buddhism in India | | | | | |
| 7th century | Indo-Sassanids | | Vakataka dynasty Empire of Harsha | Mlechchha dynasty | Adivasi (tribes) | Badami Chalukyas; Eastern Chalukyas; Pandyan kingdom (revival); Pallava |
| 7th century | Karkota dynasty | | | | Adivasi (tribes) | |
| 8th century | Kabul Shahi | Pala Empire | | | Adivasi (tribes) | Eastern Chalukyas; Pandyan kingdom Kalachuri |
| 9th century | Gurjara-Pratihara | | | | Adivasi (tribes) | Rashtrakuta Empire; Eastern Chalukyas; Pandyan kingdom Medieval Cholas; Chera Perumals of Makkotai |
| 10th century | Ghaznavids | | | Pala dynasty Kamboja-Pala dynasty | Adivasi (tribes) | Kalyani Chalukyas; Eastern Chalukyas; Medieval Cholas; Chera Perumals of Makkotai; Rashtrakuta |
References and sources for table References Sources: Flood, Gavin D. (1996), An Introduction to Hinduism, Cambridge University Press; Hiltebeitel, Alf (2002), Hinduism. In: Joseph Kitagawa, "The Religious Traditions of Asia: Religion, History, and Culture", Routledge; Michaels, Axel (2004), Hinduism. Past and present, Princeton, New Jersey: Princeton University Press
