= Agnimitra =

Shunga emperor from 149 to 141 BCE

Emperor of Magadha
- Reign: 149 – 141 BCE
- Coronation: 149 BCE
- Predecessor: Pushyamitra Shunga
- Successor: Vasujyeshtha

Crown Prince of Magadha
- Predecessor: Unknown
- Successor: Vasujyeshtha

Viceroy of Vidisha
- Spouse: Dharini; Iravati; Malavika
- Issue: Vasujyeshtha; Vasumitra
- Dynasty: Shunga
- Father: Pushyamitra Shunga
- Mother: Devamala

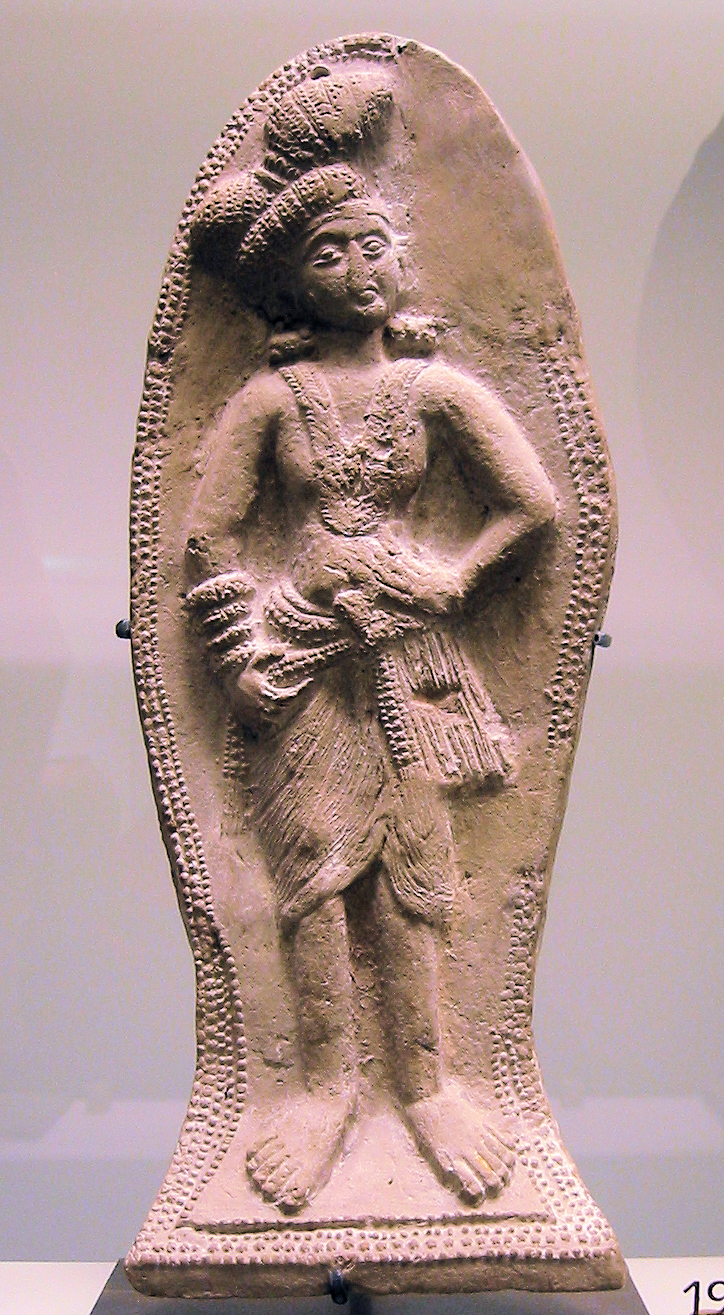
Agnimitra

Agnimitra (Sanskrit: अग्निमित्रः; r. 149 – 141 BCE) was the second Shunga emperor who reigned over what is now northern and central India. He succeeded his father, the emperor Pushyamitra, in 149 BCE. The Vayu Purana and the Brahmanda Purana have assigned 8 years as the length of his reign.

== Ancestry and early life ==
According to Kālidāsa in the Mālavikāgnimitra (Act IV, Verse 14), Agnimitra belonged to a Brahmin Baimbika family; the Puranas also mention him as a Shunga. The Mālavikāgnimitra, (Act V, Verse 20) informs us that he was the Goptri (viceroy) at Vidisha during his father's reign.

The play Mālavikāgnimitra gives the names of three of his queen-consorts: Dharini (the mother of the fourth Shunga emperor, Vasumitra), Iravati, and Malavika (a princess of Vidarbha).

== Conquest of Vidarbha ==
According to the Mālavikāgnimitra (Act I, Verse 6–8 and Act V, Verse 13–14), a war broke out between the Shungas and neighboring Vidarbha kingdom during Agnimitra's reign as viceroy of Vidisha (between 175 and 150 BCE). Before the rise of the Shungas, Vidarbha had become independent from the Mauryan Empire when a former Mauryan sachiva (secretary) put his brother-in-law Yajnasena on the throne. Madhavasena, a cousin of Yajnasena, sought help from Agnimitra in overthrowing his cousin, but was captured while crossing the border of Vidarbha and imprisoned.

Agnimitra demanded the release of Madhavasena, and in return Yajnasena demanded the release of the former Mauryan secretary, who had been captured earlier by Agnimitra. Instead, Agnimitra sent his army to invade Vidarbha. Yajnasena was defeated and forced to divide Vidarbha with Madhavasena, and both cousins recognized the suzerainty of the Shunga rulers.

== Succession ==
Agnimitra succeeded his father, the emperor Pushyamitra, in 149 BCE and reigned for eight years. His reign ended in 141 BCE, and he was succeeded either by his son Vasujyeshtha (according to the Matsya Purana) or Sujyeshtha (according to the Vayu, Brahamānda, Vishnu, and Bhagavata Puranas).

| Preceded by Pushyamitra | King of Shunga dynasty 149–141 BCE | Succeeded by Vasujyeshtha |
