= Mālavikāgnimitram =

Sanskrit play by Kālidāsa

The Mālavikāgnimitram (Sanskrit: मालविकाग्निमित्रम्, translation : Mālavikā and Agnimitra) is a Sanskrit play by Kālidāsa. Based on some events of the reign of Pushyamitra Shunga, it is his first play.

Mālavikāgnimitram tells the story of the love of Agnimitra, the Shunga Emperor at Vidisha, for the beautiful handmaiden of his chief queen. He falls in love with the picture of an exiled servant girl named Mālavikā. He must resort to the help of his jester and play a game of subterfuge merely to look at the new girl. When the queen discovers her husband's passion for this girl, she becomes infuriated and has Mālavikā imprisoned, but as fate would have it, in the end she is discovered to be of royal birth and is accepted as one of his queens.

The play contains an account of the Rajasuya sacrifice performed by Pushyamitra Shunga and an elaborate exposition of a theory on music and acting.

== The plot ==
The Mālavikāgnimitra is a drama in five Acts based on a love-intrigue set on foot by King Agnimitra of Vidisa who is the Hero of the play, Mālavikā, a princess in the service of Dharini, the chief Queen, being the Heroine. The scene is laid in Vidisa and in its vicinity.

=== Act I. ===
Prelude: After an invocation of the Deity (Siva) as an auspicious act, the stage-manager and his Assistant, in their conversation state that the play shortly to be performed is Kalidasa's Mālavikāgnimitra.

Scene: Two Queen's maid servants Vakulãvalikã and Kaumudikã meet and converse about the King Mayank's discovery of Mālavikā by the King Mayank in a group portrait, how he was struck by her charms and thus, the Queen has kept her away from King. Dancing-master Gan̩adãsa praises the intelligence and skill of his pupil Mālavikā in Vakulãvalikã’s inquiry. Vakulãvalikã tells that Mālavikā was gifted by Queen's brother Virasena.

Scene: The minister reads the letter send by King Vidarbha for the exchange of prisoners (Vidarbha's brother-in-law with Mayank's cousin). King Mayank denies the request and instead sends for an expedition against him, under the command of Virasena, the Queen's brother.

King meets the court-wit, Vidushaka Gautama. The King has asked him to help for an arrangement of meeting with Mālavikā. Vidushaka has planted a quarrel between two dancing-masters, Gan̩adãsa and Haradatta about their respective superiority. King in consultation with the Queen, holds for an exhibition where both of their pupils compete with each other. The Queen is suspicious but consents for the exhibition.

=== Act II. ===
In the exhibition, Mālavikā is allowed first to show her dance. The Kings has an opportunity to feast his eyes with the sight of Mālavikā as she sings and dances. As the sole purpose of arranging the exhibition has been achieved, further examination of the instructors' claims is postponed for the time being.

=== Act III. ===
Interlude: Two maid-servants converse that Gan̩adãsa won in the contest and the king is quite love-sick and Mālavikā is now the more carefully guarded by the Queen.

Scene: (Vakulãvalikã has promised Vidushaka to help in King's suit. The second Queen of Agnitra, Iravati has invited King for the sport of swing-riding. At same time, Queen Dharini's leg is injured. So, she sent Mālavikā to touch the Asoka tree with her foot, a procedure done to make it blossom early. She has promised to gift her if Asoka would blossom within 5 days.)

Mālavikā comes to touch the Asoka tree in the garden. King and Vidushaka hide to see her. She soliloquizes about her own deep passion for the King. Vakulãvalikã enters who decorates Mālavikā's foot with dyes, anklets, etc. Queen Iravati comes with mild intoxication. Without being observed, she listens to conversation of Mālavikā and Vakulãvalikã. Vakulãvalikã tells Mālavikā about the King's passion for her. The King then shows himself, but the love-scene is promptly marred by Iravati who breaks in upon them, sends off Mālavikā, and herself departs in high anger after an altercation.

=== Act IV. ===
Scene: The King had sent the Vidushaka to obtain news of Mālavikā. Iravati has called upon Queen Dharini and informed her of what had happened. Thereupon Dharini at her suggestion had Mālavikā and Vakulãvalikã put into a cellar as prisoners, and orders were issued to their guard that they were not to be released, unless the Queen's own snake-seal ring was produced by the messenger as guarantee of good faith. The Vidushaka devises an ingenious scheme to procure their release.

Scene: Queen Dharini is nursing her injured leg and is attended upon by the Parivrajika. Vidushaka pretends he is bitten by a serpent when he was plucking flowers for the Queen. For the treatment, Physician Dhruvasiddhi asks for a snake object for a healing procedure. The unsuspecting Queen hands the snake ring. Then King is called upon on a false message of urgent business by the minister and leaves.

Scene: By showing the signet-ring the guard, Mālavikā and Vakulãvalikã were set at liberty. King goes to meet Mālavikā and Vidushaka mounts guard outside but falls asleep which is observed by the passing guard and reports it to Queen Iravati. Iravati goes there in hope of finding the King but finds Mālavikā, Bakulavika and the King – and knows about the whole scheme. While the King is in a fix as to what to do or say next, they hear the news of Princess Vasulaksmi's accident. They depart. Mālavikā hopes that the Asoka would blossom with in five days and have the kindness of the Queen – which it did.

=== Act V. ===
Interlude: (The success of Virasena's expedition against the Vidarbha king is announced.)

Scene: In the presence of the King, the Queen, Mālavikā, and others, two captive maid-servants brought from the Vidarbha expedition are introduced, who at once recognize Mālavikā as the missing sister of Madhavasena. The minister of Madhavasena, Sumati in the confusion of Madhavasena's capture, took flight with Mālavikā and his own sister. But Sumati was attacked by highwaymen while on his way to Agnimitra's capital, and Mālavikā and Sumati's sister were separated. Sumati's sister turned into Parivrajika and attached herself to Dharini's court. Meanwhile, Mālavikā was secured by Virasena and sent to Dhaini as a gift. Parivrajika recognizes Mālavikā, but did not give out the identity of Mālavikā as Mālavikā was prophesied to remain for a year as a servant and then be married to a suitable husband.

It is now proposed to bestow one-half of the kingdom of Yajnasena (the King of the Vidarbhas) on Madhavsena. News is also brought of the victory of Agnimitra's son Vasumitra who was employed by Agnimitra's father Puspamita to guard his sacrificial horse.

The Queen on knowing all these and her promise to reward Mālavikā, gives her to the King and gladly consents to their union.

After this happy termination of the course of the royal love, the play ends with the customary Bharatavakya which here takes the form of an expression of general peace and happiness among the King's subjects.

== Adaptations ==
The play was adapted into an Indian silent film, Malvikagni Mitra, in 1929 by Dadasaheb Phalke. It was also adapted as a comic by Kamlesh Pandey in the 569th issue of the Indian comic book series, Amar Chitra Katha.

== See also ==
- Sanskrit literature
- Sanskrit drama
- List of Sanskrit plays in English translation
