= Indo-Greek Kingdom =

200 BC–10 AD Greek kingdom in South Asia

- 200 BC–10 AD
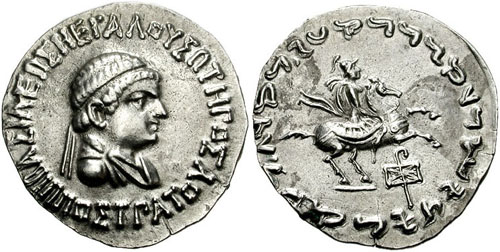
- Coin of the Indo-Greek king Hippostratus.

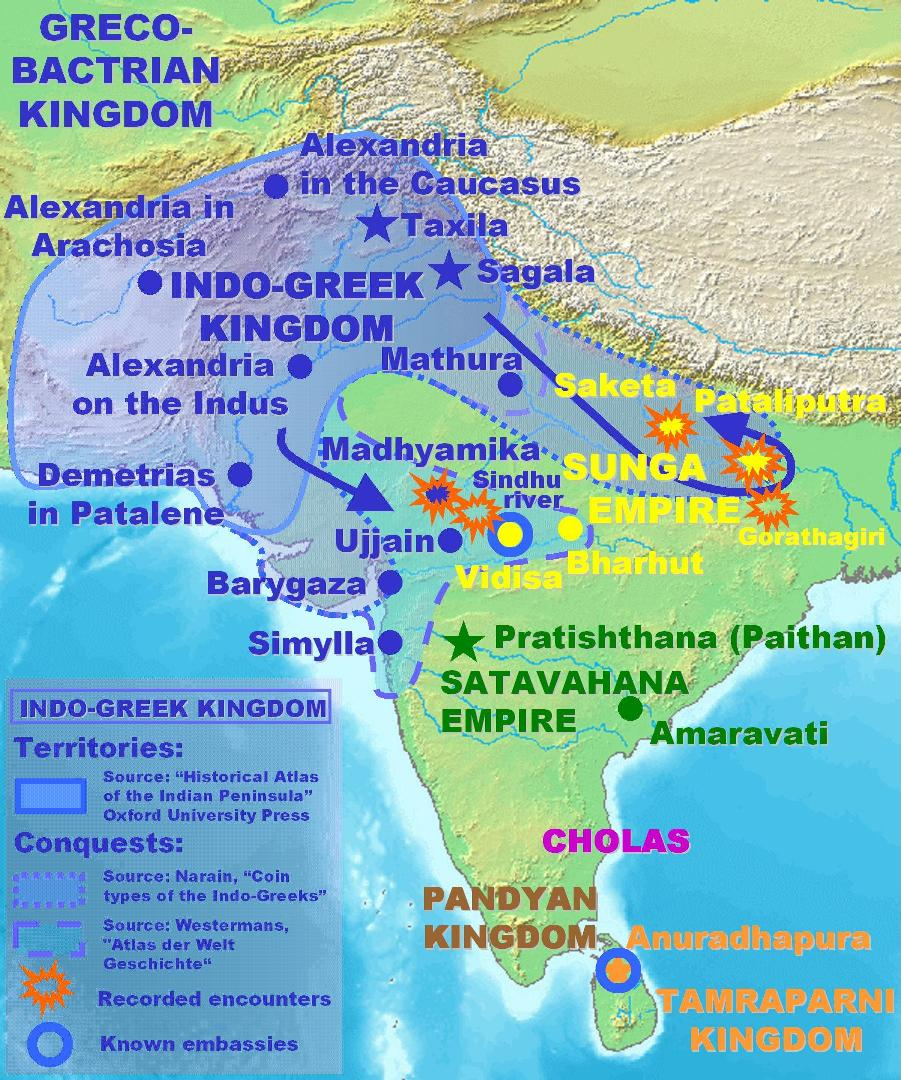
- Greatest extent of the kingdom (2nd-century BCE)
- Capital: Taxila; Sagala
- Common languages: Koine Greek; Gandhari; Pali; Sanskrit; Prakrit
- Religion: Greco-Buddhism (Ruling dynasty); Other religions Ancient Greek religion Buddhism; Hinduism; Jainism; Zoroastrianism
- Government: Monarchy
- Basileus
  - 200–180 BC: Demetrius I (first)
  - 174–165 BC: Antimachus II
  - 165/155–130 BC: Menander the Great
  - 25 BC–10 AD: Strato III (last)
- Historical era: Antiquity
  - Established: 200 BC
  - Disestablished: 10 AD

Area
- 150 BC: 1,100,000 km^{2} (420,000 sq mi)
Preceded by	Succeeded by
Greco-Bactrian Kingdom; Maurya Empire	Indo-Scythians; Indo-Parthians
- Today part of: Afghanistan; Pakistan; India

The Indo-Greek Kingdom, also known as the Yavana Kingdom, (Note: also Yavanarajya after the word Yona, which comes from Ionians) were Hellenistic-era Greek kingdoms in the northwestern part of the Indian subcontinent covering most of modern-day Pakistan, parts of northwestern India and some eastern parts of Afghanistan.

The term "Indo-Greek Kingdom" loosely describes a number of various Hellenistic states, ruling from regional capitals like Taxila, Sagala, Pushkalavati, and Bagram. Other centers are only hinted at; e.g. Ptolemy's Geographia and the nomenclature of later kings suggest that Theophilus in the south of the Indo-Greek sphere of influence may also have had a royal seat there at one time.

The kingdom was founded when the Graeco-Bactrian king Demetrius I of Bactria invaded India from Bactria in about 200 BC. The Greeks to the east of the Seleucid Empire were eventually divided to the Graeco-Bactrian Kingdom and the Indo-Greek Kingdoms in the North Western Indian Subcontinent.

During the two centuries of their rule, the Indo-Greek kings combined the Greek and Indian languages and symbols, as seen on their coins, and blended Greek and Indian ideas, as seen in the archaeological remains. The diffusion of Indo-Greek culture had consequences which are still felt today, particularly through the influence of Greco-Buddhist art. The ethnicity of the Indo-Greek may also have been hybrid to some degree. Euthydemus I was, according to Polybius, a Magnesian Greek. Euthydemus I was an Ionian-Greek from one of the Magnesias in Ionia, though it is uncertain from which one (Magnesia on the Maeander or Magnesia ad Sipylum). His son, Demetrius I, founder of the Indo-Greek kingdom, was therefore of Greek ethnicity at least by his father. A marriage treaty was arranged for the same Demetrius with a daughter of the Seleucid ruler Antiochus III. The ethnicity of later Indo-Greek rulers is sometimes less clear. For example, Artemidoros (80 BC) was supposed to have been of Indo-Scythian descent, although he is now seen as a regular Indo-Greek king.

Menander I, being the most well known amongst the Indo-Greek kings, is often referred to simply as "Menander," despite the fact that there was indeed another Indo-Greek King known as Menander II. Menander I's capital was at Sakala in the Punjab (present-day Sialkot). Following the death of Menander, most of his empire splintered and Indo-Greek influence was considerably reduced. Many new kingdoms and republics east of the Ravi River began to mint new coinage depicting military victories. The most prominent entities to form were the Yaudheya Republic, Arjunayanas, and the Audumbaras. The Yaudheyas and Arjunayanas both are said to have won "victory by the sword". The Datta dynasty and Mitra dynasty soon followed in Mathura.

The Indo-Greeks ultimately disappeared as a political entity around 10 AD following the invasions of the Indo-Scythians, although pockets of Greek populations probably remained for several centuries longer under the subsequent rule of the Indo-Parthians, the Kushans, (Note: "When the Greeks of Bactria and India lost their kingdom they were not all killed, nor did they return to Greece. They merged with the people of the area and worked for the new masters; contributing considerably to the culture and civilization in southern and central Asia." Narain, "The Indo-Greeks" 2003, p. 278) and the Indo-Scythians, whose Western Satraps state lingered on encompassing local Greeks, up to 415 AD.

== Background ==
=== Initial Greek presence in the Indian subcontinent ===
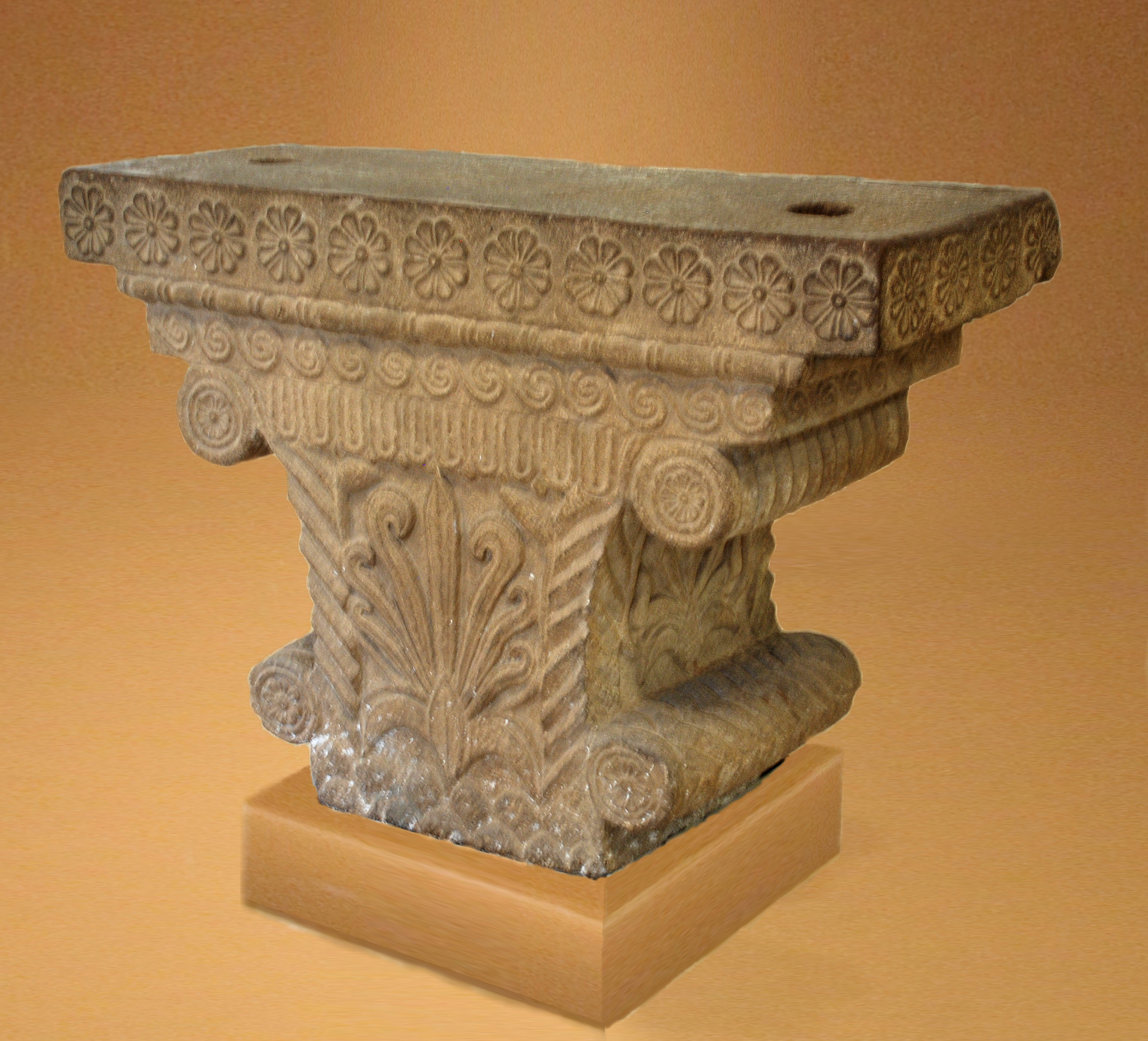
Pataliputra Palace capital, showing Greek and Persian influence, early Mauryan Empire period, 3rd century BC.

Greeks first began to establish authority in the Northwestern part of the Indian subcontinent during the time of the Persian Achaemenid Empire. Darius the Great conquered the area, but along with his successors also conquered much of the Greek world, which at the time included all of the western Anatolian peninsula. When Greek villages rebelled under the Persian yoke, they were sometimes ethnically cleansed, their inhabitants relocated to the far side of the empire around today's Afghanistan. Over time they grew influential politically and rose to power establishing their own independent kingdoms and expanding their realm in all directions.

In the fourth century BC, Alexander the Great defeated and conquered the Persian empire. In 326 BC, this included the northwestern part of the Indian subcontinent as far as the Hyphasis River. Alexander established satrapies and founded several cities, including Bucephala; he turned south when his troops refused to go further east. The Indian satrapies of the Punjab were left to the rule of Porus and Taxiles, who were confirmed again at the Treaty of Triparadisus in 321 BC, and the remaining Greek troops in these satrapies were left under the command of Alexander's general Eudemus. After 321 BC Eudemus toppled Taxiles, until he left India in 316 BC. To the south, another general also ruled over the Greek colonies of the Indus: Peithon, son of Agenor, until his departure for Babylon in 316 BC.

Around 322 BC, the Greeks (described as Yona or Yavana in Indian sources) may then have participated, together with other groups, in the uprising of Chandragupta Maurya against the Nanda dynasty, and gone as far as Pataliputra for the capture of the city from the Nandas. The Mudrarakshasa of Visakhadutta as well as the Jaina work Parisishtaparvan talk of Chandragupta's alliance with the Himalayan king Parvatka, often identified with Porus, and according to these accounts, this alliance gave Chandragupta a composite and powerful army made up of Yavanas (Greeks), Kambojas, Shakas (Scythians), Kiratas (Nepalese), Parasikas (Persians) and Bahlikas (Bactrians) who took Pataliputra.

In 305 BC, Seleucus I led an army to the Indus, where he encountered Chandragupta. The confrontation ended with a peace treaty, and "an intermarriage agreement" (Epigamia, Greek: Ἐπιγαμία), meaning either a dynastic marriage or an agreement for intermarriage between Indians and Greeks. Accordingly, Seleucus ceded his eastern territories to Chandragupta, possibly as far as Arachosia and received 500 war elephants (which played a key role in Seleucus's victory at the Battle of Ipsus):

The Indians occupy in part some of the countries situated along the Indus, which formerly belonged to the Persians: Alexander deprived the Ariani of them, and established there settlements of his own. But Seleucus Nicator gave them to Sandrocottus in consequence of a marriage contract, and received in return five hundred elephants.

— Strabo 15.2.1(9)

The details of the marriage agreement are not known, but since the extensive sources available on Seleucus never mention an Indian princess, it is thought that the marital alliance went the other way, with Chandragupta himself or his son Bindusara marrying a Seleucid princess, in accordance with contemporary Greek practices to form dynastic alliances. An Indian Puranic source, the Pratisarga Parva of the Bhavishya Purana, described the marriage of Chandragupta with a Greek ("Yavana") princess, daughter of Seleucus, before accurately detailing early Mauryan genealogy:

"Chandragupta married with a daughter of Suluva, the Yavana king of Pausasa. Thus, he mixed the Buddhists and the Yavanas. He ruled for 60 years. From him, Vindusara was born and ruled for the same number of years as his father. His son was Ashoka."

— Pratisarga Parva

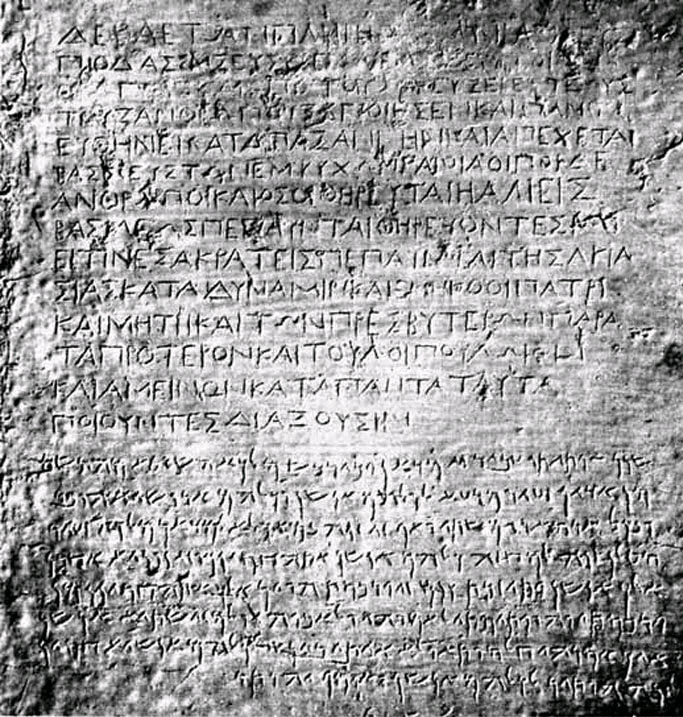
Kandahar Bilingual Rock Inscription (Greek and Aramaic) by king Ashoka, from Kandahar, Afghanistan.

Chandragupta, however, followed Jainism until the end of his life. He got in his court for marriage the daughter of Seleucus Nicator, and thus, he mixed the Indians and the Greeks. His grandson Ashoka, as Woodcock and other scholars have suggested, "may in fact have been half or at least a quarter Greek."

Also several Greeks, such as the historian Megasthenes, followed by Deimachus and Dionysius, were sent to reside at the Mauryan court. Presents continued to be exchanged between the two rulers. The intensity of these contacts is testified by the existence of a dedicated Mauryan state department for Greek (Yavana) and Persian foreigners, or the remains of Hellenistic pottery that can be found throughout northern India.

On these occasions, Greek populations apparently remained in the northwest of the Indian subcontinent under Mauryan rule. Chandragupta's grandson Ashoka, who had converted to the Buddhist faith declared in the Edicts of Ashoka, set in stone, some of them written in Greek, that Greek populations within his realm also had converted to Buddhism:

Here in the king's domain among the Greeks, the Kambojas, the Nabhakas, the Nabhapamkits, the Bhojas, the Pitinikas, the Andhras and the Palidas, everywhere people are following Beloved-of-the-Gods' instructions in Dharma.

— Rock Edict Nb13 (S. Dhammika).

In his edicts, Ashoka mentions that he had sent Buddhist emissaries to Greek rulers as far as the Mediterranean (Edict No. 13), and that he developed herbal medicine in their territories, for the welfare of humans and animals (Edict No. 2).

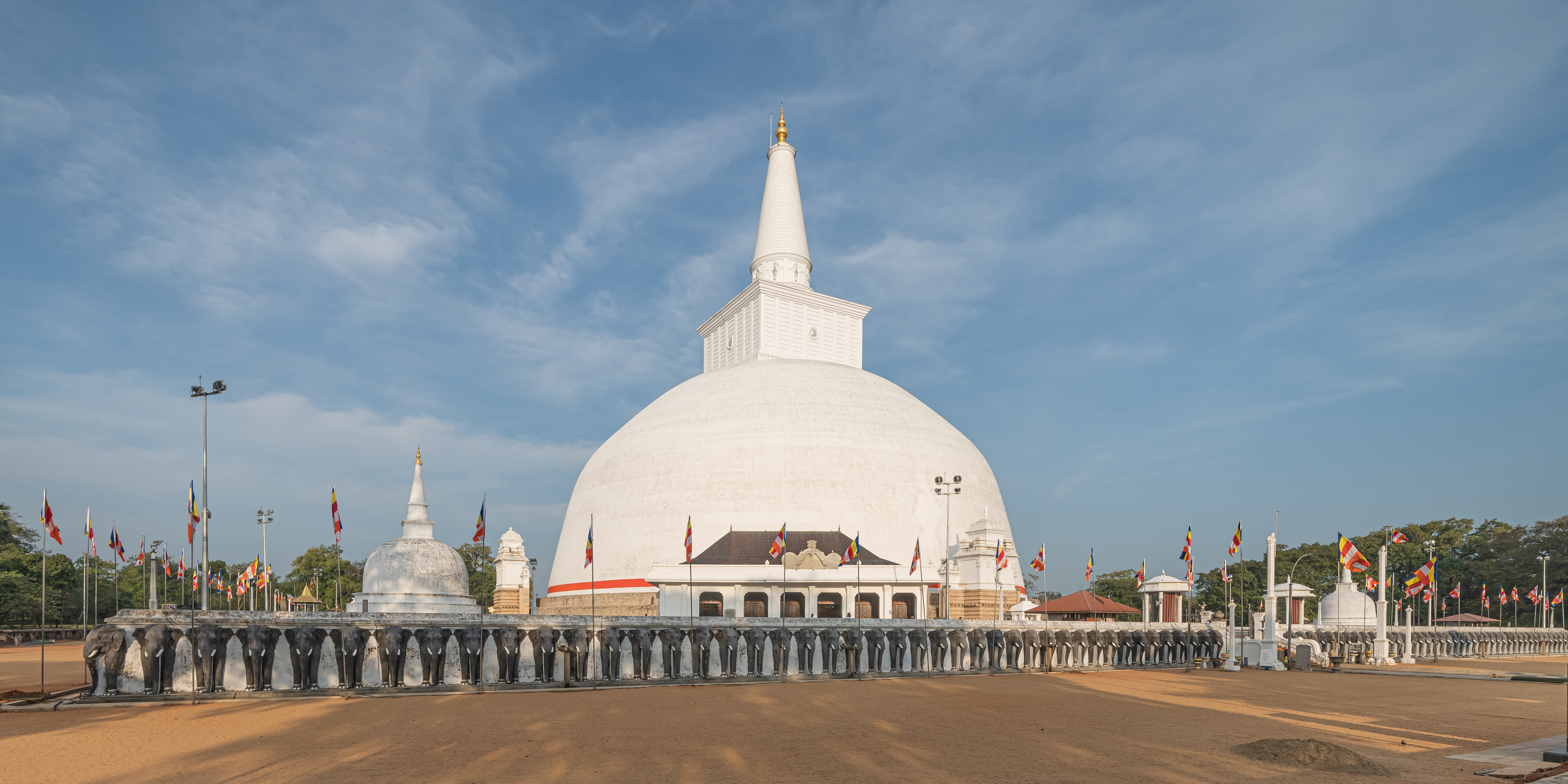
According to the Mahavamsa, the Great Stupa in Anuradhapura, Sri Lanka, was dedicated by a 30,000-strong "Yona" (Greek) delegation from "Alexandria" around 130 BC.

The Greeks in India even seem to have played an active role in the propagation of Buddhism, as some of the emissaries of Ashoka such as Dharmaraksita, or the teacher Mahadharmaraksita, are described in Pali sources as leading Greek ("Yona", i.e., Ionian) Buddhist monks, active in Buddhist proselytism (the Mahavamsa, XII). It is also thought that Greeks contributed to the sculptural work of the Pillars of Ashoka, and more generally to the blossoming of Mauryan art. Some Greeks (Yavanas) may have played an administrative role in the territories ruled by Ashoka: the Junagadh rock inscription of Rudradaman records that during the rule of Ashoka, a Yavana King/ Governor named Tushaspha was in charge in the area of Girnar, Gujarat, mentioning his role in the construction of a water reservoir.

Again in 206 BC, the Seleucid emperor Antiochus led an army to the Kabul valley, where he received war elephants and presents from the local king Sophagasenus:

He (Antiochus) crossed the Caucasus (the Caucasus Indicus or Paropamisus: mod. Hindú Kúsh) and descended into India; renewed his friendship with Sophagasenus the king of the Indians; received more elephants, until he had a hundred and fifty altogether; and having once more provisioned his troops, set out again personally with his army: leaving Androsthenes of Cyzicus the duty of taking home the treasure which this king had agreed to hand over to him.

— Polybius, Histories 11.39

=== Greek rule in Bactria ===
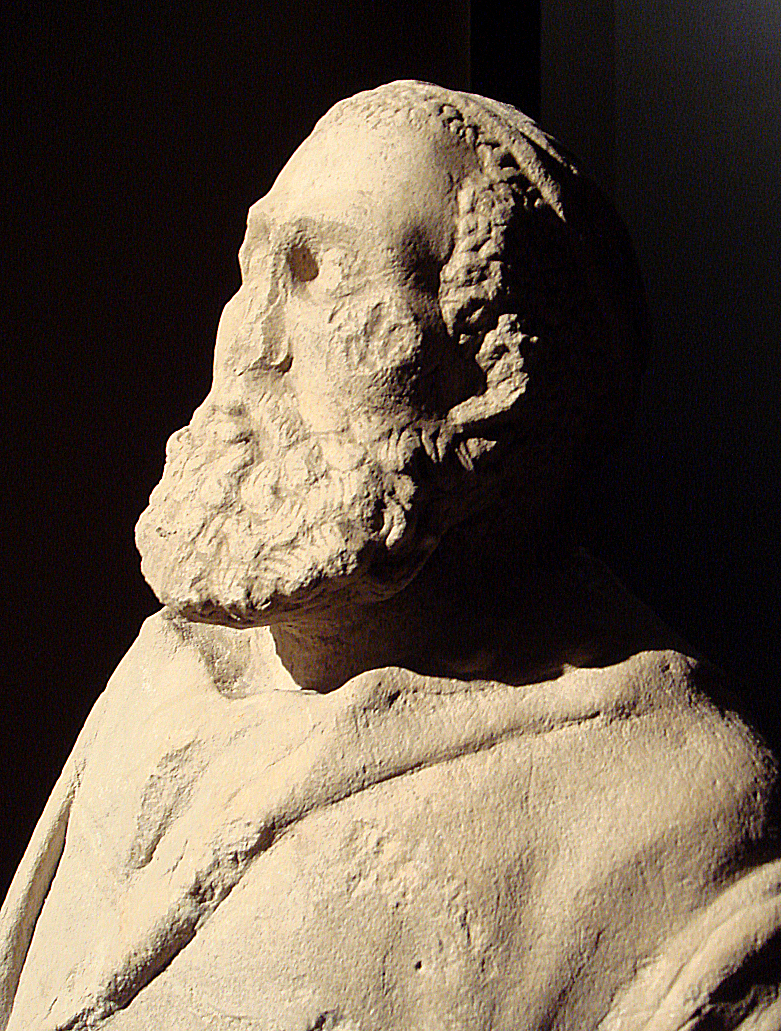
Greco-Bactrian statue of an old man or philosopher, Ai Khanoum, Bactria, 2nd century BC

Alexander had also established several colonies in neighbouring Bactria, such as Alexandria on the Oxus (modern Ai-Khanoum) and Alexandria of the Caucasus (medieval Kapisa, modern Bagram). After Alexander's death in 323 BC, Bactria came under the control of Seleucus I Nicator, who founded the Seleucid Empire. The Greco-Bactrian Kingdom was founded when Diodotus I, the satrap of Bactria (and probably the surrounding provinces) seceded from the Seleucid Empire around 250 BC. The preserved ancient sources (see below) are somewhat contradictory and the exact date of Bactrian independence has not been settled. Somewhat simplified, there is a high chronology (c. 255 BC) and a low chronology (c. 246 BC) for Diodotos' secession. The high chronology has the advantage of explaining why the Seleucid king Antiochus II issued very few coins in Bactria, as Diodotos would have become independent there early in Antiochus' reign. On the other hand, the low chronology, from the mid-240s BC, has the advantage of connecting the secession of Diodotus I with the Third Syrian War, a catastrophic conflict for the Seleucid Empire.

Diodotus, the governor of the thousand cities of Bactria (Latin: Theodotus, mille urbium Bactrianarum praefectus), defected and proclaimed himself king; all the other people of the Orient followed his example and seceded from the Macedonians.

— (Justin, XLI,4)

The new kingdom, highly urbanized and considered one of the richest of the Orient (opulentissimum illud mille urbium Bactrianum imperium "The extremely prosperous Bactrian empire of the thousand cities" Justin, XLI,1), was to further grow in power and engage into territorial expansion to the east and the west:

The Greeks who caused Bactria to revolt grew so powerful on account of the fertility of the country that they became masters, not only of Ariana, but also of India, as Apollodorus of Artemita says: and more tribes were subdued by them than by Alexander... Their cities were Bactra (also called Zariaspa, through which flows a river bearing the same name and emptying into the Oxus), and Darapsa, and several others. Among these was Eucratidia, which was named after its ruler.

— (Strabo, XI.XI.I)

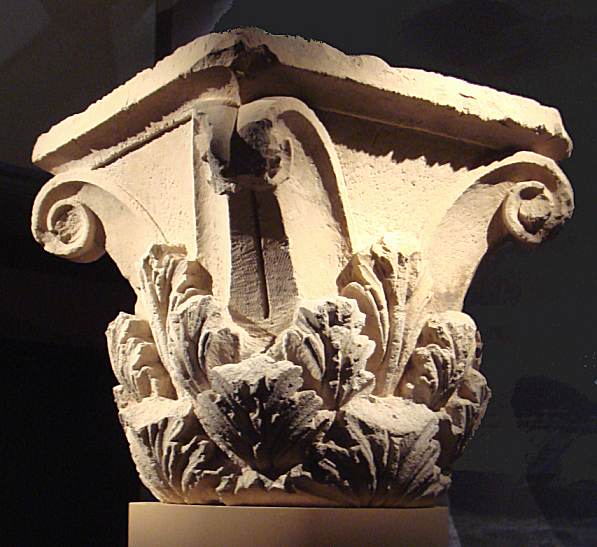
Corinthian capital, found at Ai-Khanoum, 2nd century BC

When the ruler of neighbouring Parthia, the former satrap and self-proclaimed king Andragoras, was eliminated by Arsaces, the rise of the Parthian Empire cut off the Greco-Bactrians from direct contact with the Greek world. Overland trade continued at a reduced rate, while sea trade between Greek Egypt and Bactria developed.

Diodotus was succeeded by his son Diodotus II, who allied himself with the Parthian Arsaces in his fight against Seleucus II:

Soon after, relieved by the death of Diodotus, Arsaces made peace and concluded an alliance with his son, also by the name of Diodotus; some time later he fought against Seleucos who came to punish the rebels, and he prevailed: the Parthians celebrated this day as the one that marked the beginning of their freedom

— (Justin, XLI,4)

Euthydemus, a Magnesian Greek according to Polybius and possibly satrap of Sogdiana, overthrew Diodotus II around 230 BC and started his own dynasty. Euthydemus's control extended to Sogdiana, going beyond the city of Alexandria Eschate founded by Alexander the Great in Ferghana:

"And they also held Sogdiana, situated above Bactriana towards the east between the Oxus River, which forms the boundary between the Bactrians and the Sogdians, and the Iaxartes River. And the Iaxartes forms also the boundary between the Sogdians and the nomads.

— Strabo XI.11.2

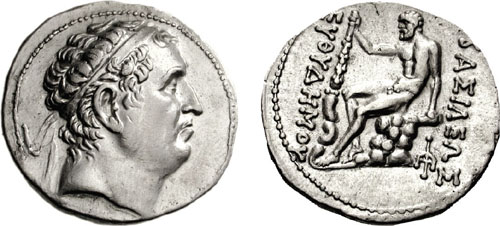
Coin depicting the Greco-Bactrian king Euthydemus I, c. 230–200 BC. The reverse shows seated Heracles holding club. The Greek inscription reads: ΒΑΣΙΛΕΩΣ ΕΥΘΥΔΗΜΟΥ – "(of) King Euthydemus".

Euthydemus was attacked by the Seleucid ruler Antiochus III around 210 BC. Although he commanded 10,000 horsemen, Euthydemus initially lost a battle on the Arius and had to retreat. He then successfully resisted a three-year siege in the fortified city of Bactra (modern Balkh), before Antiochus finally decided to recognize the new ruler, and to offer one of his daughters to Euthydemus's son Demetrius around 206 BC. Classical accounts also relate that Euthydemus negotiated peace with Antiochus III by suggesting that he deserved credit for overthrowing the original rebel Diodotus, and that he was protecting Central Asia from nomadic invasions thanks to his defensive efforts:

...for if he did not yield to this demand, neither of them would be safe: seeing that great hordes of Nomads were close at hand, who were a danger to both; and that if they admitted them into the country, it would certainly be utterly barbarised.

— (Polybius, 11.34)

Following the departure of the Seleucid army, the Bactrian kingdom seems to have expanded. In the west, areas in north-eastern Iran may have been absorbed, possibly as far as into Parthia, whose ruler had been defeated by Antiochus the Great. These territories possibly are identical with the Bactrian satrapies of Tapuria and Traxiane.

To the north, Euthydemus also ruled Sogdiana and Ferghana, and there are indications that from Alexandria Eschate the Greco-Bactrians may have led expeditions as far as Kashgar and Ürümqi in Chinese Turkestan, leading to the first known contacts between China and the West around 220 BC. The Greek historian Strabo too writes that:

they extended their empire even as far as the Seres (Chinese) and the Phryni

— (Strabo, XI.XI.I)

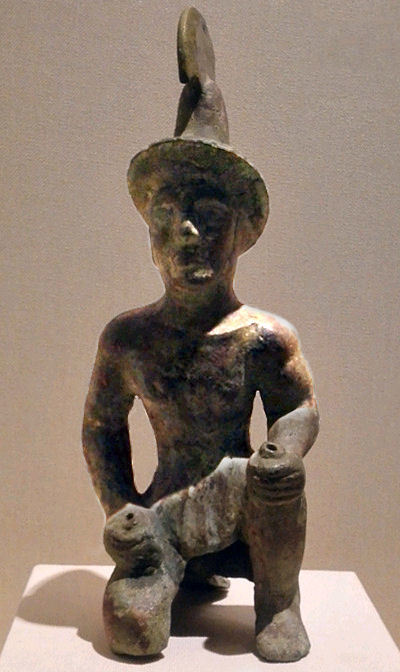
Possible statuette of a Greek soldier, wearing a version of the Greek Phrygian helmet, from a 3rd-century BC burial site north of the Tian Shan, Xinjiang Region Museum, Urumqi.

Several statuettes and representations of Greek soldiers have been found north of the Tien Shan, on the doorstep to China, and are today on display in the Xinjiang museum at Urumqi (Boardman).

Greek influences on Chinese art have also been suggested (Hirth, Rostovtzeff). Designs with rosette flowers, geometric lines, and glass inlays, suggestive of Hellenistic influences, can be found on some early Han dynasty bronze mirrors.

Numismatics also suggest that some technology exchanges may have occurred on these occasions: the Greco-Bactrians were the first in the world to issue cupro-nickel (75/25 ratio) coins, an alloy technology only known by the Chinese at the time under the name "White copper" (some weapons from the Warring States period were in copper-nickel alloy). The practice of exporting Chinese metals, in particular iron, for trade is attested around that period. Kings Euthydemus, Euthydemus II, Agathocles and Pantaleon made these coin issues around 170 BC and it has alternatively been suggested that a nickeliferous copper ore was the source from mines at Anarak. Copper-nickel would not be used again in coinage until the 19th century.

The presence of Chinese people in the Indian subcontinent from ancient times is also suggested by the accounts of the "Ciñas" in the Mahabharata and the Manu Smriti.

The Han dynasty explorer and ambassador Zhang Qian visited Bactria in 126 BC, and reported the presence of Chinese products in the Bactrian markets:

"When I was in Bactria (Daxia)", Zhang Qian reported, "I saw bamboo canes from Qiong and cloth made in the province of Shu (territories of southwestern China). When I asked the people how they had gotten such articles, they replied, "Our merchants go buy them in the markets of Shendu (India)."

— (Shiji 123, Sima Qian, trans. Burton Watson)

Upon his return, Zhang Qian informed the Chinese emperor Han Wudi of the level of sophistication of the urban civilizations of Ferghana, Bactria and Parthia, who became interested in developing commercial relationships with them:

The Son of Heaven on hearing all this reasoned thus: Ferghana (Dayuan) and the possessions of Bactria (Daxia) and Parthia (Anxi) are large countries, full of rare things, with a population living in fixed abodes and given to occupations somewhat identical with those of the Chinese people, and placing great value on the rich produce of China

— (Hanshu, Former Han History)

A number of Chinese envoys were then sent to Central Asia, triggering the development of the Silk Road from the end of the 2nd century BC.

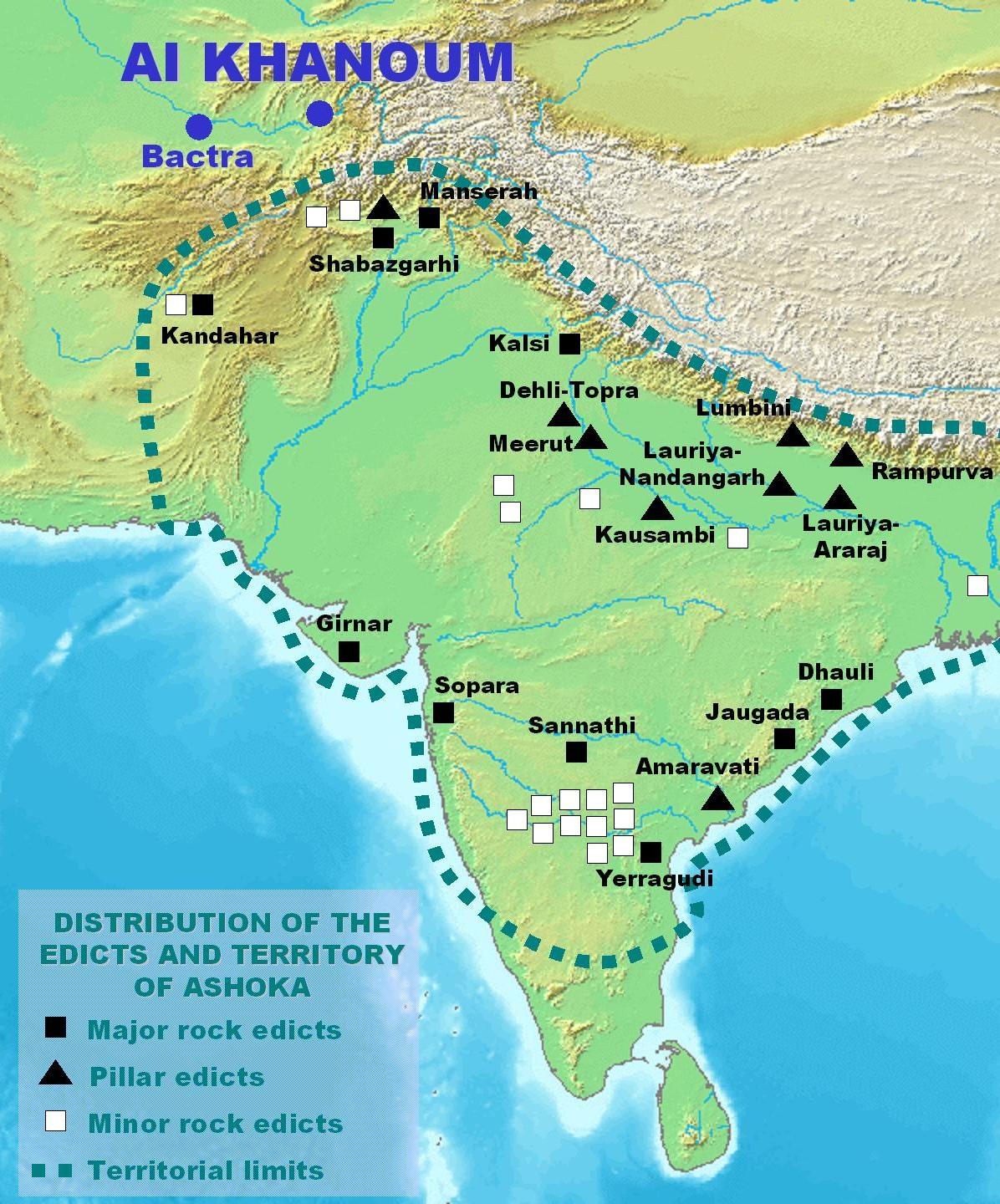
Greco-Bactria and the city of Ai-Khanoum were located at the very doorstep of Mauryan India.

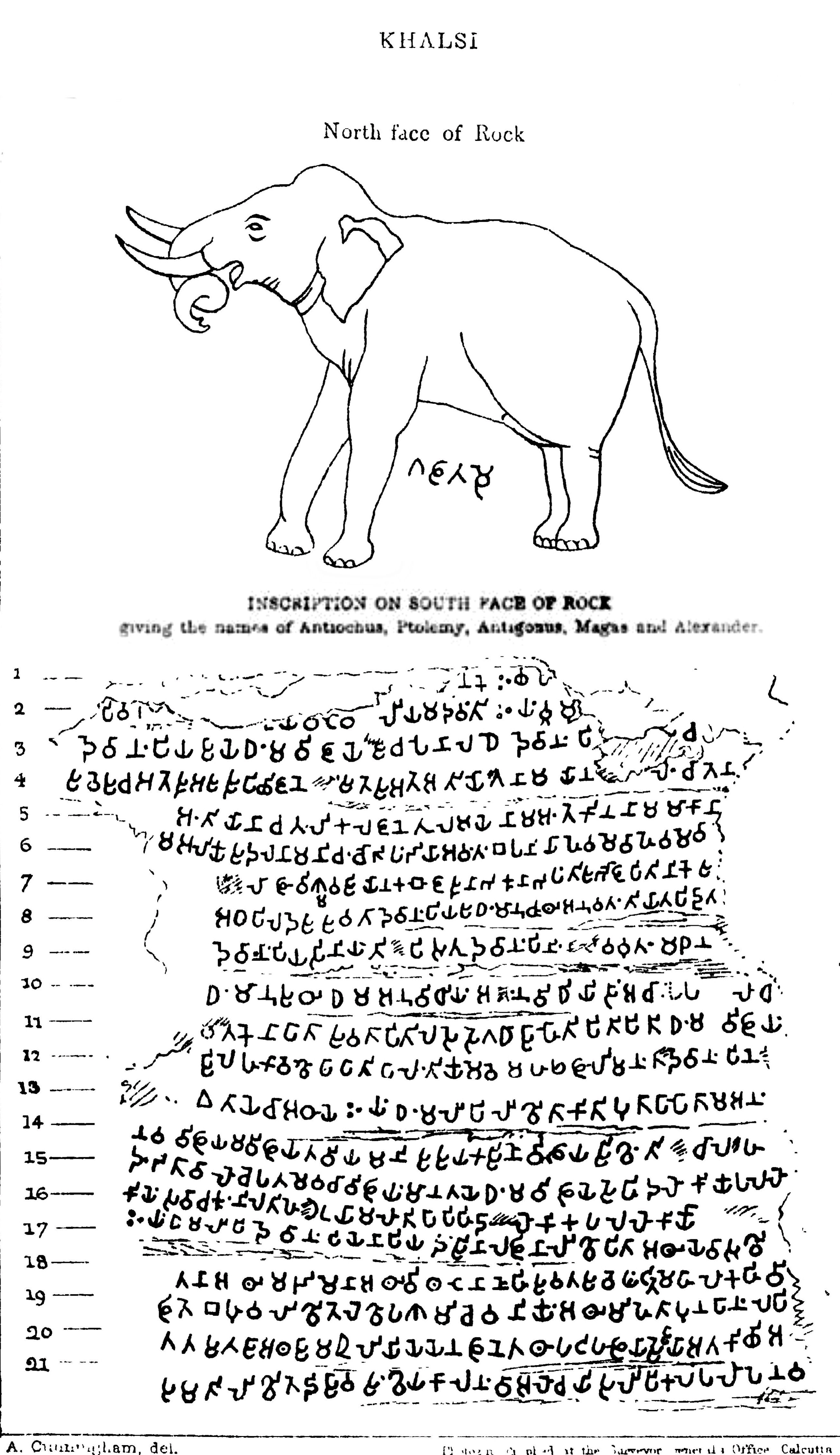
The Khalsi rock edict of Ashoka, which mentions the Greek kings Antiochus, Ptolemy, Antigonus, Magas and Alexander by name, as recipients of his teachings.

The Indian emperor Chandragupta, founder of the Mauryan dynasty, had re-conquered northwestern India upon the death of Alexander the Great around 322 BC. However, contacts were kept with his Greek neighbours in the Seleucid Empire, a dynastic alliance or the recognition of intermarriage between Greeks and Indians were established (described as an agreement on Epigamia in Ancient sources), and several Greeks, such as the historian Megasthenes, resided at the Mauryan court. Subsequently, each Mauryan emperor had a Greek ambassador at his court.

Chandragupta's grandson Ashoka converted to the Buddhist faith and became a great proselytizer in the line of the traditional Pali canon of Theravada Buddhism, directing his efforts towards the Indian and the Hellenistic worlds from around 250 BC. According to the Edicts of Ashoka, set in stone, some of them written in Greek, he sent Buddhist emissaries to the Greek lands in Asia and as far as the Mediterranean. The edicts name each of the rulers of the Hellenistic world at the time.

The conquest by Dharma has been won here, on the borders, and even six hundred yojanas (4,000 miles) away, where the Greek king Antiochos rules, beyond there where the four kings named Ptolemy, Antigonos, Magas and Alexander rule, likewise in the south among the Cholas, the Pandyas, and as far as Tamraparni.

— (Edicts of Ashoka, 13th Rock Edict, S. Dhammika)

Some of the Greek populations that had remained in northwestern India apparently converted to Buddhism:

Here in the king's domain among the Greeks, the Kambojas, the Nabhakas, the Nabhapamkits, the Bhojas, the Pitinikas, the Andhras and the Palidas, everywhere people are following Beloved-of-the-Gods' instructions in Dharma.

— (Edicts of Ashoka, 13th Rock Edict, S. Dhammika)

Furthermore, according to Pali sources, some of Ashoka's emissaries were Greek Buddhist monks, indicating close religious exchanges between the two cultures:

When the thera (elder) Moggaliputta, the illuminator of the religion of the Conqueror (Ashoka), had brought the (third) council to an end… he sent forth theras, one here and one there: …and to Aparantaka (the "Western countries" corresponding to Gujarat and Sindh) he sent the Greek (Yona) named Dhammarakkhita... and the thera Maharakkhita he sent into the country of the Yona.

— (Mahavamsa XII)

Greco-Bactrians probably received these Buddhist emissaries (At least Maharakkhita, lit. "The Great Saved One", who was "sent to the country of the Yona") and somehow tolerated the Buddhist faith, although little proof remains. In the 2nd century AD, the Christian dogmatist Clement of Alexandria recognized the existence of Buddhist Sramanas among the Bactrians ("Bactrians" meaning "Oriental Greeks" in that period), and even their influence on Greek thought:

Thus philosophy, a thing of the highest utility, flourished in antiquity among the barbarians, shedding its light over the nations. And afterwards it came to Greece. First in its ranks were the prophets of the Egyptians; and the Chaldeans among the Assyrians; and the Druids among the Gauls; and the Sramanas among the Bactrians ("Σαρμαναίοι Βάκτρων"); and the philosophers of the Celts; and the Magi of the Persians, who foretold the Saviour's birth, and came into the land of Judea guided by a star. The Indian gymnosophists are also in the number, and the other barbarian philosophers. And of these there are two classes, some of them called Sramanas ("Σαρμάναι"), and others Brahmins ("Βραφμαναι").

— Clement of Alexandria, "The Stromata, or Miscellanies" Book I, Chapter XV

=== Rise of the Shungas (185 BC) ===
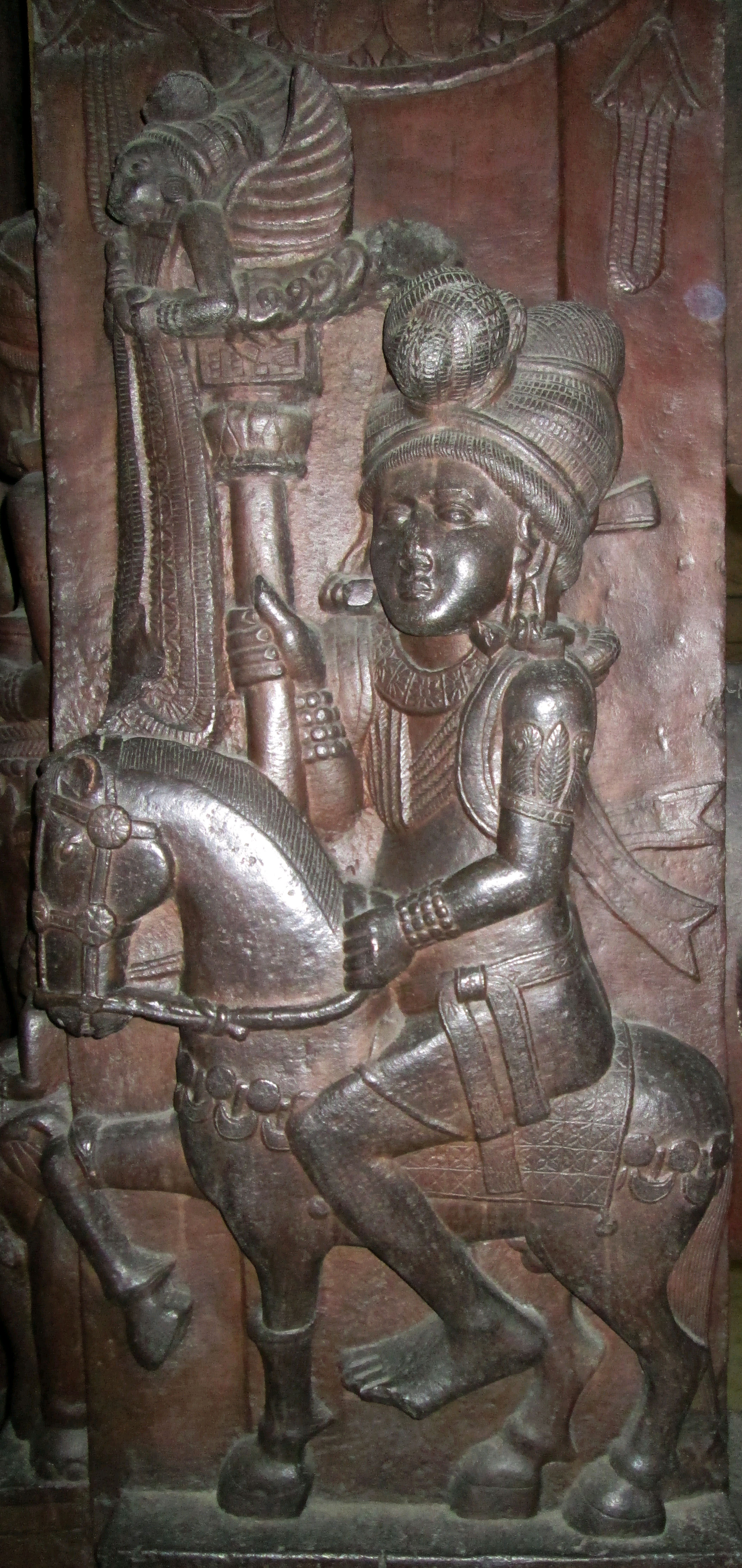
Shunga horseman, Bharhut.

In India, the Maurya dynasty was overthrown around 185 BC when Pushyamitra Shunga, the commander-in-chief of Mauryan Imperial forces and a Brahmin, assassinated the last of the Mauryan emperors Brihadratha. Pushyamitra Shunga then ascended the throne and established the Shunga Empire, which extended its control as far west as the Punjab.

Buddhist sources, such as the Ashokavadana, mention that Pushyamitra was hostile towards Buddhists and allegedly persecuted the Buddhist faith. A large number of Buddhist monasteries (viharas) were allegedly converted to Hindu temples, in such places as Nalanda, Bodhgaya, Sarnath or Mathura. While it is established by secular sources that Hinduism and Buddhism were in competition during this time, with the Shungas preferring the former to the latter, historians such as Etienne Lamotte and Romila Thapar argue that Buddhist accounts of persecution of Buddhists by Shungas are largely exaggerated. Some Puranic sources however also describe the resurgence of Brahmanism following the Maurya dynasty, and the killing of millions of Buddhists, such as the Pratisarga Parva of the Bhavishya Purana:

"At this time [after the rule of Chandragupta, Bindusara and Ashoka] the best of the brahmanas, Kanyakubja, performed sacrifice on the top of a mountain named Arbuda. By the influence of Vedic mantras, four Kshatriyas appeared from the yajna (sacrifice). (...) They kept Ashoka under their control and annihilated all the Buddhists. It is said there were 4 million Buddhists and all of them were killed by uncommon weapons".

— Pratisarga Parva

== History ==
=== Sources ===
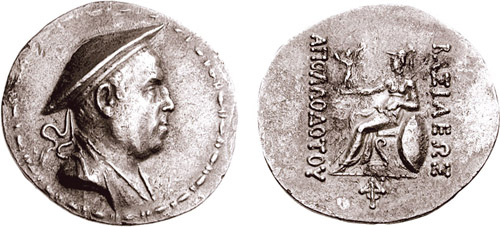
Apollodotus I (180–160 BC), the first king who ruled in the subcontinent only, and therefore the founder of the proper Indo-Greek kingdom.

Some narrative history has survived for most of the Hellenistic world, at least of the kings and the wars; this is lacking for India. The main Greco-Roman source on the Indo-Greeks is Justin, who wrote an anthology drawn from the Roman historian Pompeius Trogus, who in turn wrote, from Greek sources, at the time of Augustus Caesar. In addition to these dozen sentences, the geographer Strabo mentions India a few times in the course of his long dispute with Eratosthenes about the shape of Eurasia. Most of these are purely geographical claims, but he does mention that Eratosthenes' sources say that some of the Greek kings conquered further than Alexander; Strabo does not believe them on this, nor does he believe that Menander and Demetrius son of Euthydemus conquered more tribes than Alexander There is half a story about Menander in one of the books of Polybius which has not come down to us intact.

There are Indian literary sources, ranging from the Milinda Panha, a dialogue between a Buddhist sage Nagasena and Indianized names that may be related to Indo-Greek kings such as Menander I. Names in these sources are consistently Indianized, and there is some dispute whether, for example, Dharmamitra represents "Demetrius" or is an Indian prince with that name. There was also a Chinese expedition to Bactria by Chang-k'ien under the Emperor Wu of Han, recorded in the Records of the Grand Historian and Book of the Former Han, with additional evidence in the Book of the Later Han; the identification of places and peoples behind transcriptions into Chinese is difficult, and several alternate interpretations have been proposed.

Other evidence of the broader and longer influence of Indo-Greeks is possibly suggested by Yavanarajya inscription, dated to the 1st-century BC. It mentions Yavanas, a term which is derived from "Ionians", and which at that time most likely means "Indo-Greeks".

=== Expansion of Demetrius into India ===
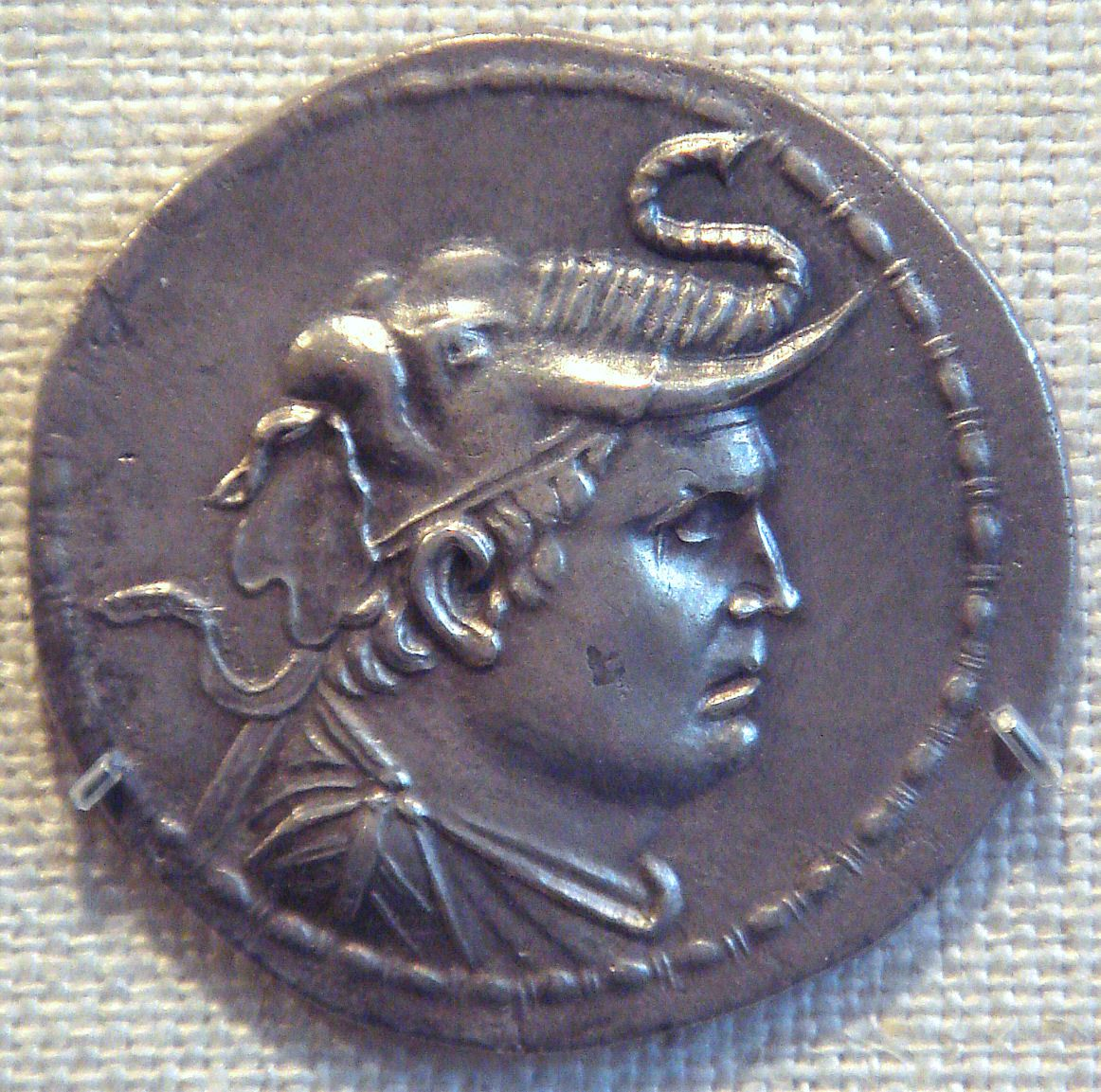
Silver coin depicting Demetrius I of Bactria (reigned c. 200–180 BC), wearing an elephant scalp, symbol of his conquests of areas in what is now Afghanistan and Pakistan.

Demetrius I, the son of Euthydemus is generally considered the Greco-Bactrian king who first launched the Greek expansion into India. He is therefore the founder of the Indo-Greek realm. The true intents of the Greek kings in occupying India are unknown, but it is thought that the elimination of the Maurya Empire by the Sunga greatly encouraged this expansion. The Indo-Greeks, in particular Menander I who is said in the Milindapanha to have converted to Buddhism, also possibly received the help of Indian Buddhists.

There is an inscription from his father's reign already officially hailing Demetrius as victorious. He also has one of the few absolute dates in Indo-Greek history: after his father held off Antiochus III for two years, 208–6 BC, the peace treaty included the offer of a marriage between Demetrius and Antiochus' daughter. Coins of Demetrius I have been found in Arachosia and in the Kabul Valley; the latter would be the first entry of the Greeks into India, as they defined it. There is also literary evidence for a campaign eastward against the Seres and the Phryni; but the order and dating of these conquests is uncertain.

Demetrius I seems to have conquered the Kabul valley, Arachosia and perhaps Gandhara; he struck no Indian coins, so either his conquests did not penetrate that far into India or he died before he could consolidate them. On his coins, Demetrius I always carries the elephant-helmet worn by Alexander, which seems to be a token of his Indian conquests. Bopearachchi believes that Demetrius received the title of "King of India" following his victories south of the Hindu Kush. He was also given, though perhaps only posthumously, the title Ἀνίκητος ("Aniketos", lit. Invincible) a cult title of Heracles, which Alexander had assumed; the later Indo-Greek kings Lysias, Philoxenus, and Artemidorus also took it. Finally, Demetrius may have been the founder of a newly discovered Yavana era, starting in 186/5 BC.

==== First bilingual and multi-religion monetary system ====
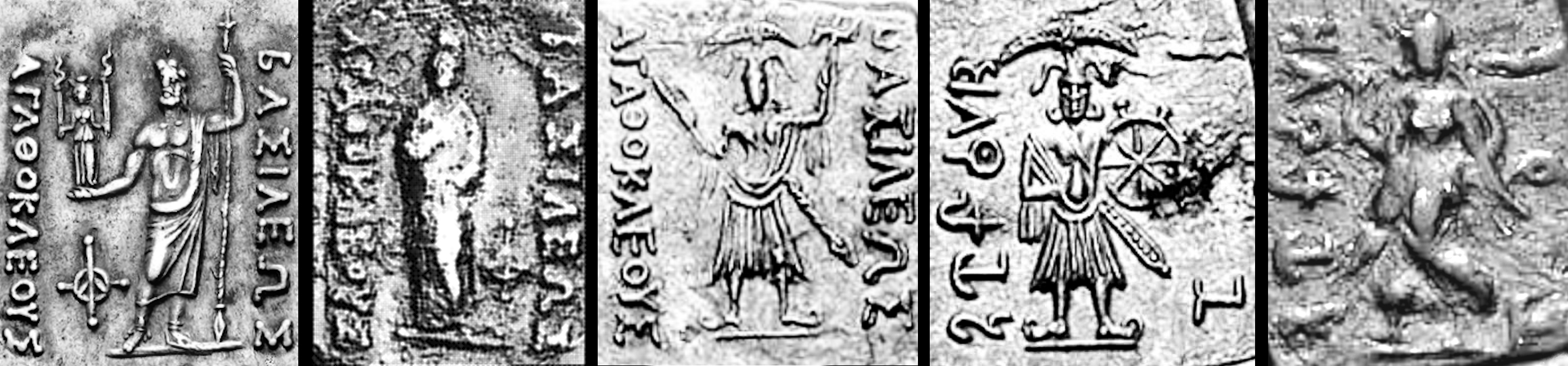
The coinage of Agathocles (circa 180 BC) incorporated the Brahmi script and several deities from India, which have been variously interpreted as Vishnu, Shiva, Vasudeva, Balarama or the Buddha.

After the death of Demetrius, the Bactrian kings Pantaleon and Agathocles struck the first bilingual coins with Indian inscriptions found as far east as Taxila so in their time (c. 185–170 BC) the Bactrian kingdom seems to have included Gandhara. These first bilingual coins used the Brahmi script, whereas later kings would generally use Kharoshthi. They also went as far as incorporating Indian deities, variously interpreted as Hindu deities or the Buddha. They also included various Indian devices (lion, elephant, zebu bull) and symbols, some of them Buddhist such as the tree-in-railing. These symbols can also be seen in the Post-Mauryan coinage of Gandhara.

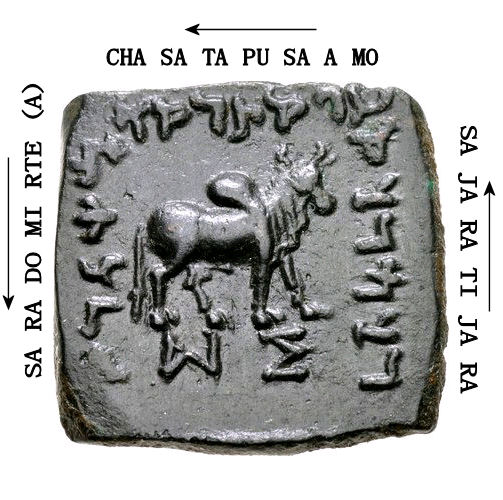
Kharoshthi legend on the reverse of a coin of Indo-Greek king Artemidoros Aniketos.

The Hinduist coinage of Agathocles is few but spectacular. Six Indian-standard silver drachmas were discovered at Ai-Khanoum in 1970, which depict Hindu deities. These are early Avatars of Vishnu: Balarama-Sankarshana with attributes consisting of the Gada mace and the plow, and Vasudeva-Krishna with the Vishnu attributes of the Shankha (a pear-shaped case or conch) and the Sudarshana Chakra wheel. These first attempts at incorporating Indian culture were only partly preserved by later kings: they all continued to struck bilingual coins, sometimes in addition to Attic coinage, but Greek deities remained prevalent. Indian animals however, such as the elephant, the bull or the lion, possibly with religious overtones, were used extensively in their Indian-standard square coinage. Buddhist wheels (Dharmachakras) still appear in the coinage of Menander I and Menander II.

Several Bactrian kings followed after Demetrius' death, and it seems likely that the civil wars between them made it possible for Apollodotus I (from c. 180/175 BC) to make himself independent as the first proper Indo-Greek king (who did not rule from Bactria). Large numbers of his coins have been found in India, and he seems to have reigned in Gandhara as well as western Punjab. Apollodotus I was succeeded by or ruled alongside Antimachus II, likely the son of the Bactrian king Antimachus I.

=== Rule of Menander I ===
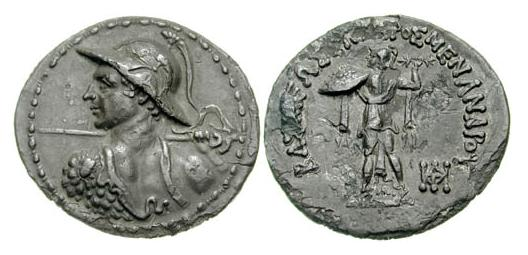
Menander I (155–130 BC) is one of the few Indo-Greek kings mentioned in both Graeco-Roman and Indian sources.

The next important Indo-Greek king was Menander I who is considered to have been the most successful of the Indo-Greek kings, and who expanded the kingdom to its greatest extent by means of his various conquests. The finds of his coins are the most numerous and occur across the greatest geographical area, more than any of the other Indo-Greek kings. Coins stamped with Menander's likeness can be found as far away as Eastern Punjab over 600 miles distant. Menander seems to have begun a second wave of conquests, and it seems likely that the easternmost conquests were made by him.

Thus from 165 BCE until his death in 130 BCE, Menander I ruled Punjab with Sagala as his capital. Menander subsequently made an expedition across northern India to Mathura, where the Yavnarajya inscription was recorded. However, it is not known if this was a contiguous empire, or ruled through key city centers or polis. Soon after, Eucratides I king of the Greco-Bactrian Kingdom began warring with the Indo-Greeks in the north western frontier.

According to Apollodorus of Artemita, quoted by Strabo, the Indo-Greek territory for a while included the Indian coastal provinces of Sindh and possibly Gujarat. With archaeological methods, the Indo-Greek territory can however only be confirmed from the Kabul Valley to the eastern Punjab, so Greek presence outside was probably short-lived or non-existent.

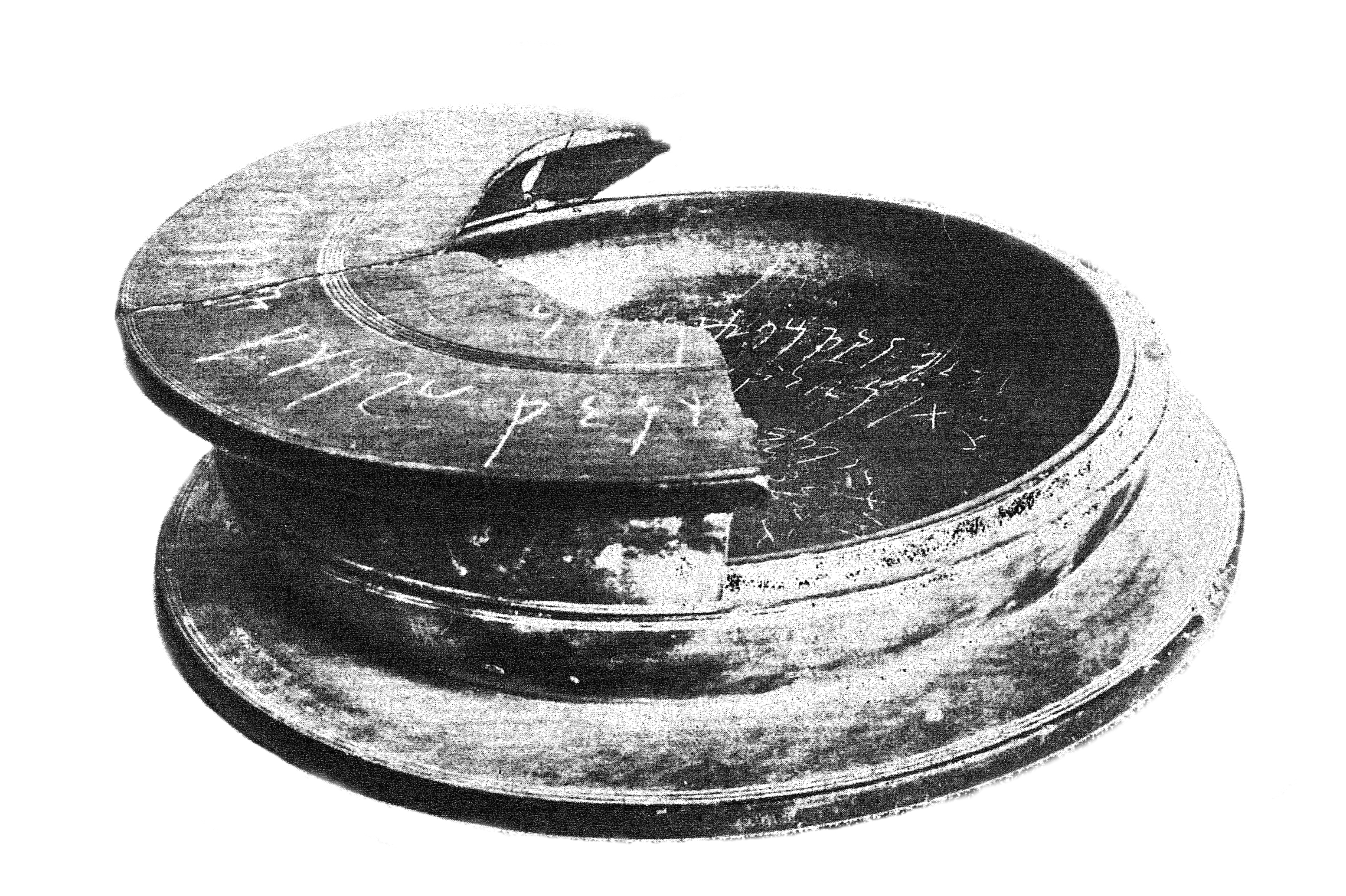
The Shinkot casket containing Buddhist relics was dedicated "in the reign of the Great King Menander".

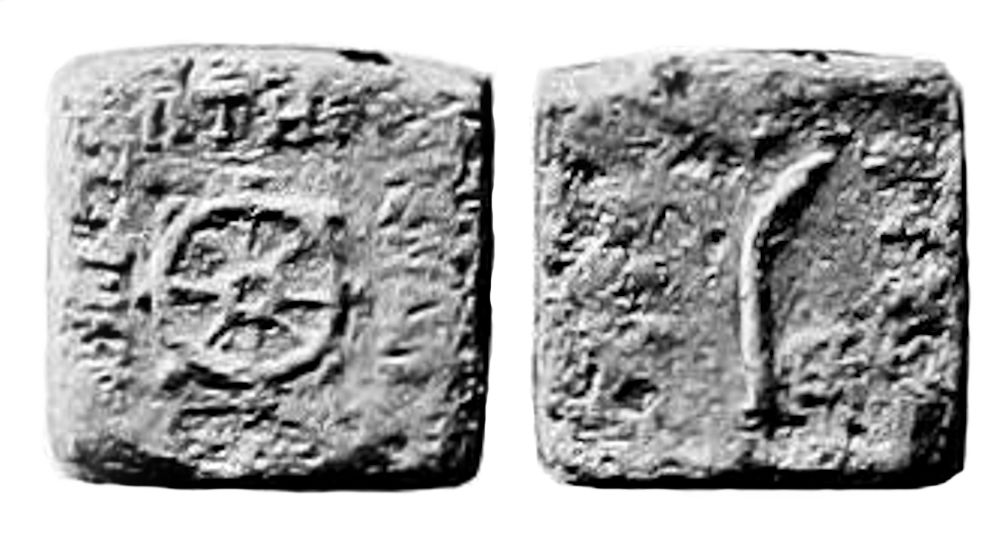
Indian-standard coinage of Menander I with wheel design. Obv ΒΑΣΙΛΕΩΣ ΣΩΤΗΡΟΣ ΜΕΝΑΝΔΡΟΥ "Of Saviour King Menander" around wheel. Rev Palm of victory, Kharoshthi legend Māhārajasa trātadasa Menandrāsa, British Museum.

Some sources also claim that the Indo-Greeks may have reached the Shunga capital Pataliputra in northern India. However, the nature of this expedition is a matter of controversy. The only recorded primary account regarding this campaign was written in the Yuga Purana, however this text was written as a forthcoming prophecy of an impending conflict. It is not known if the expedition was carried out, or if the Yavanas (Indo-Greeks) were successful in this campaign.

"After having conquered Saketa, the country of the Panchala and the Mathuras, the Yavanas, wicked and valiant, will reach Kusumadhvaja ("The town of the flower-standard", Pataliputra). The thick mud-fortifications at Pataliputra being reached, all the provinces will be in disorder, without doubt. Ultimately, a great battle will follow, with tree-like engines (siege engines)."

— Yuga Purana (Gargi-Samhita, Paragraph 5)

However the claim that the Yavanas held Pataliputra is not supported by numismatic or historical accounts, and is even contradicted by some inscriptions. King Kharavela of Kalinga, during his forth year reigning, was recorded in the Hathigumpha inscription to have routed a demoralized Indo-Greek army back to Mathura. It is not known which Indo-Greek was leading the army at the time, however it is presumed to be Menander I or perhaps even a later ruler. Then during his twelfth year in power, Kharavela is recorded to have battled the Shunga Empire and defeated the emperor Brhaspatimitra, known as Pushyamitra Shunga. Kharavela is then stated to have sacked the capital Pataliputra, and reclaimed the Jain idols and treasures that had been plundered from Kalinga and taken to Pataliputra. Based on the chronology and date during 1st century BC, it is postulated that Menander was the one leading the Indo-Greeks during Kharavela's reign.

"Then in the eighth year, (Kharavela) with a large army having sacked Goradhagiri causes pressure on Rajagaha (Rajagriha). On account of the loud report of this act of valour, the Yavana (Greek) King Dimi[ta] retreated to Mathura having extricated his demoralized army."

— Hathigumpha inscription (lines 7-8)

The important Bactrian king Eucratides seems to have attacked the Indo-Greek kingdom during the mid 2nd century BC. A Demetrius, called "King of the Indians", seems to have confronted Eucratides in a four-month siege, reported by Justin, but he ultimately lost. (Note: Justin refers to an incident in which Eucratides with a small force of 300 was besieged for four months by "Demetrius, king of the Indians" with a large army of 60,000. The numbers are obviously an exaggeration. Eucratides managed to break out and went on to conquer India.)

It is uncertain who this Demetrius was, and when the siege happened. Some scholars believe that it was Demetrius I."(Demetrius I) was probably the Demetrius who besieged Eucratides for four months", D.W. Mac Dowall, pp. 201–202, Afghanistan, ancien carrefour entre l'est et l'ouest. This analysis goes against Bopearachchi, who has suggested that Demetrius I died long before Eucratides came to power. In any case, Eucratides seems to have occupied territory as far as the Indus, between ca. 170 BC and 150 BC. His advances were ultimately reclaimed by the Indo-Greek king Menander I,

Menander is also remembered in Buddhist literature, where he is called Milinda. He is described in the Milinda Panha as a convert to Buddhism and that he became an arhat whose relics were enshrined in a manner reminiscent of a Buddha. He also introduced a new coin type, with Athena Alkidemos ("Protector of the people") on the reverse, which was adopted by most of his successors in the East.

Following the death of Menander his empire was greatly reduced due to the emergence of new kingdoms and republics within India. The most eminent entities to reform were the Yaudheya and the Arjunayanas, which were military confederations that had been annexed by the Maurya Empire. These republics began to mint new coins mentioning military victories, that were reminiscent of Indo-Greek type coins. Along with numismatic evidence, the Junagadh rock inscription of Rudradaman details the conquests of the Saka King Rudradaman I of the Western Satraps over the Yaudheya Republic, reaffirming their independence during the time of the Indo-Scythian invasions.

From the mid-2nd century BC, the Scythians, in turn being pushed forward by the Yuezhi who were completing a long migration from the border of China, started to invade Bactria from the north. Around 130 BC the last Greco-Bactrian king Heliocles was probably killed during the invasion and the Greco-Bactrian kingdom proper ceased to exist. The Parthians also probably played a role in the downfall of the Bactrian kingdom, and supplanted the Scythians.

There are however no historical recordings of events in the Indo-Greek kingdom after Menander's death around 130 BC, since the Indo-Greeks had now become very isolated from the rest of the Graeco-Roman world. The later history of the Indo-Greek states, which lasted to around the shift BC/AD, is reconstructed almost entirely from archaeological and numismatical analyses.

==== Western accounts ====
Greek presence in Arachosia, where Greek populations had been living since before the acquisition of the territory by Chandragupta from Seleucus, is mentioned by Isidore of Charax. He describes Greek cities there, one of them called Demetrias, probably in honour of the conqueror Demetrius.

Apollodotus I (and Menander I) were mentioned by Pompeius Trogus as important Indo-Greek kings. It is theorized that Greek advances temporarily went as far as the Shunga capital Pataliputra (today Patna) in eastern India. Senior considers that these conquests can only refer to Menander: Against this, John Mitchiner considers that the Greeks probably raided the Indian capital of Pataliputra during the time of Demetrius, though Mitchiner's analysis is not based on numismatic evidence.

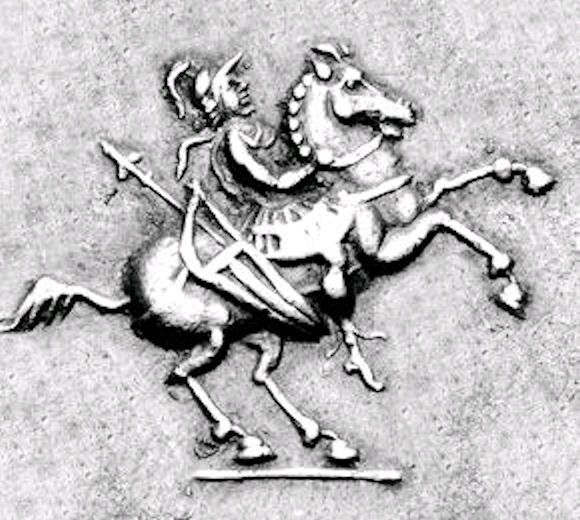
King Hippostratos armed with bow and arrows, and riding a horse, circa 100 BC (coin detail).

Of the eastern parts of India, then, there have become known to us all those parts which lie this side of the Hypanis, and also any parts beyond the Hypanis of which an account has been added by those who, after Alexander, advanced beyond the Hypanis, to the Ganges and Pataliputra.

— Strabo, 15-1-27

The seriousness of the attack is in some doubt: Menander may merely have joined a raid led by Indian Kings down the Ganges, as Indo-Greek presence has not been confirmed this far east.

To the south, the Greeks may have occupied the areas of the Sindh and Gujarat, including the strategic harbour of Barygaza (Bharuch), conquests also attested by coins dating from the Indo-Greek ruler Apollodotus I and by several ancient writers (Strabo 11; Periplus of the Erythraean Sea, Chap. 41/47):

The Greeks... took possession, not only of Patalene, but also, on the rest of the coast, of what is called the kingdom of Saraostus and Sigerdis.

— Strabo 11.11.1

The Periplus further explains ancient Indo-Greek rule and continued circulation of Indo-Greek coinage in the region:

"To the present day ancient drachmae are current in Barygaza, coming from this country, bearing inscriptions in Greek letters, and the devices of those who reigned after Alexander, Apollodorus [sic] and Menander."

— Periplus Chap. 47

Narain however dismisses the account of the Periplus as "just a sailor's story", and holds that coin finds are not necessarily indicators of occupation. Coin hoards further suggest that in Central India, the area of Malwa may also have been conquered.

==== Rule in Mathura ====
The Yavanarajya inscription discovered in Mathura, mentions its carving on "The last day of year 116 of Yavana hegemony" (Yavanarajya), or 116th year if the Yavana era, suggesting the Greeks ruled over Mathura as late as 60 BC. Mathura Museum.

From numismatic, literary and epigraphic evidence, it seems that the Indo-Greeks also had control over Mathura during the period between 185 BCE and 85 BCE, and especially during the rule of Menander I (165–135 BC). Ptolemy mentioned that Menander's ruler extended to Mathura (Μόδυρα).

Slightly northwest of Mathura, numerous Indo-Greek coins were found in the city of Khokrakot (modern Rohtak), belonging to as many as 14 different Indo-Greek kings, as well as coin molds in Naurangabad, suggesting Indo-Greek occupation of Haryana in the 2nd-1st centuries BC.

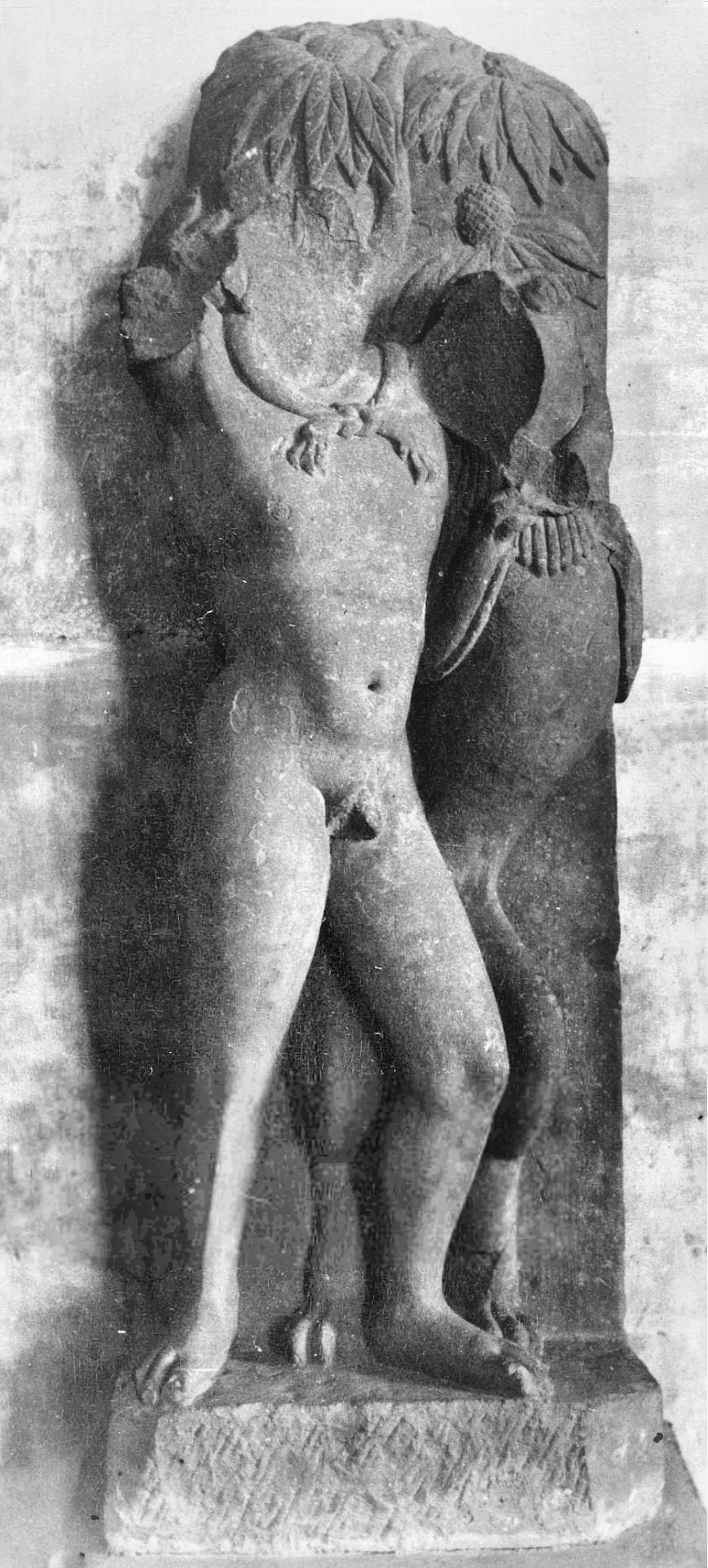
The Mathura Herakles. A statue of Herakles strangling the Nemean lion from Mathura. Today in the Kolkota Indian Museum.

An inscription in Mathura discovered in 1988, the Yavanarajya inscription, mentions "The last day of year 116 of Yavana hegemony (Yavanarajya)". The "Yavanarajya" probably refers to the rule of the Indo-Greeks in Mathura as late as around 70–60 BC (year 116 of the Yavana era). The extent of Indo-Greek rule in Mathura has been disputed, but it is also known that no remains of Sunga rule have been found in Mathura, and their territorial control is only proved as far as the central city of Ayodhya in northern central India, through the Dhanadeva-Ayodhya inscription. Archeological excavations of cast die-struck coins have also revealed the presence of a Mitra dynasty (coin issuers who did not name themselves "kings" on their coins) in Mathura sometime between 150 BC to 20 BC. Additionally, coins belonging to a Datta dynasty have also been excavated in Mathura. Whether these dynasties ruled independently or as satraps to larger kingdoms is unknown.

===== Figurines of foreigners in Mathura =====
Figurines of foreigners in Mathura

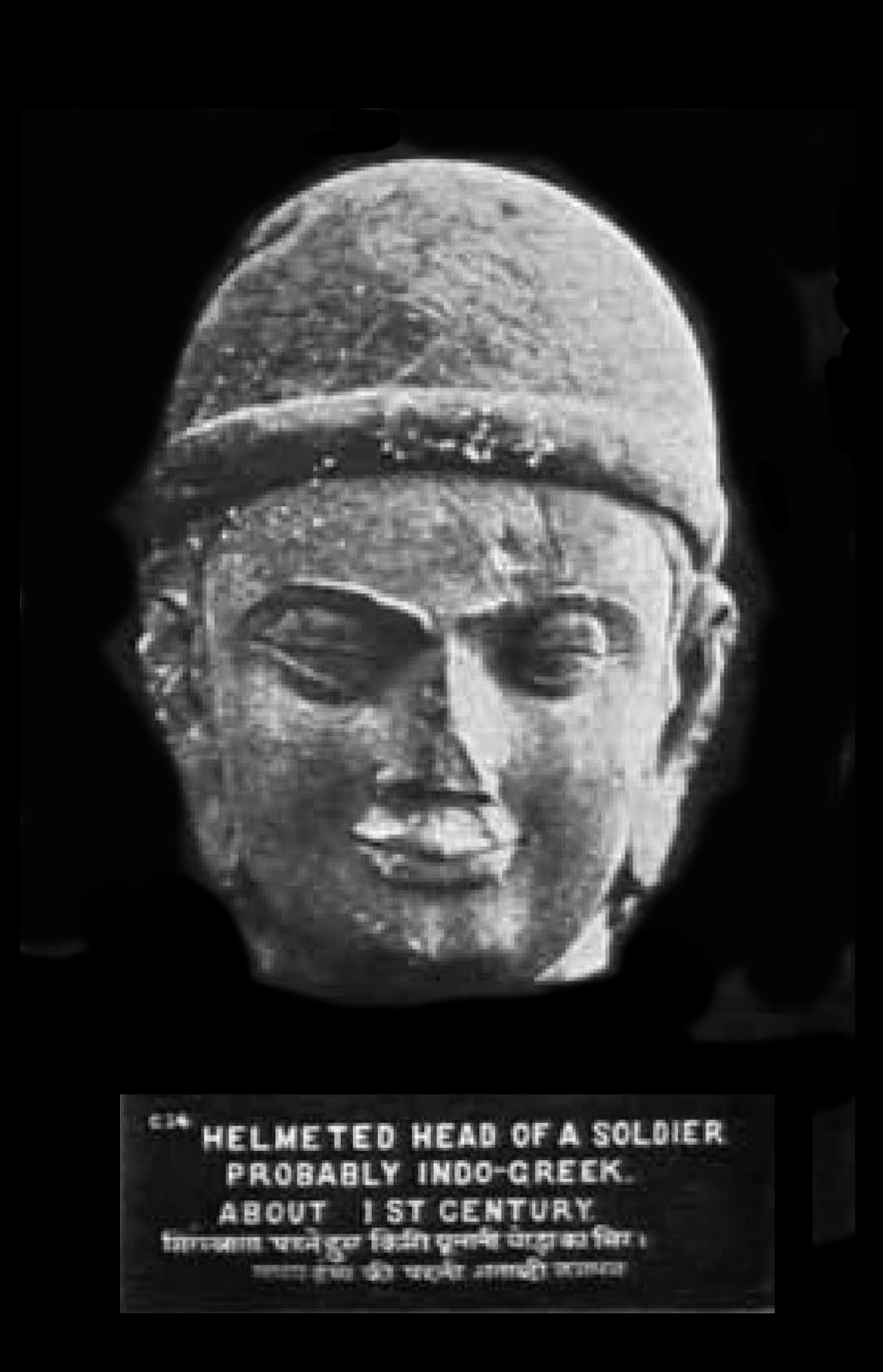
Helmeted head of a soldier, "probably Indo-Greek", 1st century BCE, Mathura Museum.

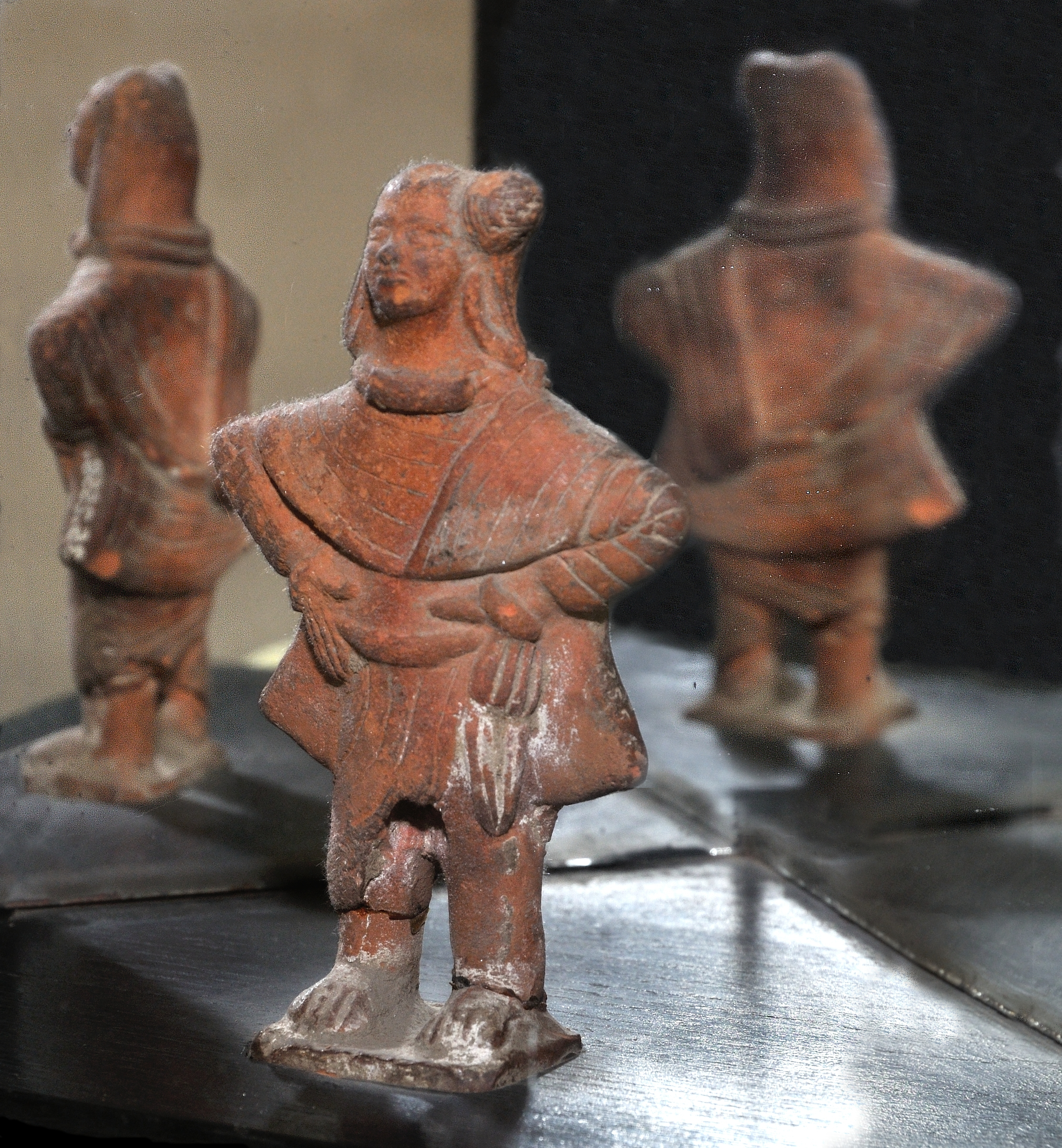
"Persian Nobleman clad in coat dupatta trouser and turban", Mathura, c. 2nd century BCE. Mathura Museum.

Several figures of foreigners appear in the terracottas of Mathura art from the 4th to the 2nd century BCE, which are either described simply as "foreigners" or Persian or Iranian because of their foreign features. These figurines might reflect the increased contacts of Indians with foreigners during this period. Several of these seem to represent foreign soldiers who visited India during the Mauryan period and influenced modellers in Mathura with their peculiar ethnic features and uniforms. A helmeted head of a soldier, probably Indo-Greek, is also known, and dated to the 1st century BCE, now in the Mathura Museum. One of the terracotta statuettes, usually nicknamed the "Persian nobleman" and dated to the 2nd century BCE, can be seen wearing a coat, scarf, trousers and a turban.

Mathura may then have been conquered by the Mitra dynasty, or ruled independently by the Datta dynasty during the 1st century BC. In any case Mathura was under the control of the Indo-Scythian Northern Satraps from the 1st century of the Christian era.

===== Indian sources =====
The term Yavana is thought to be a transliteration of "Ionians" and is known to have designated Hellenistic Greeks (starting with the Edicts of Ashoka, where Ashoka writes about "the Yavana king Antiochus"), but may have sometimes referred to other foreigners as well after the 1st century AD.

Patanjali, a grammarian and commentator on Pāṇini, around 150 BC, describes in the Mahābhāsya, the invasion in two examples using the imperfect tense Sanskrit, denoting a recent or ongoing events:

- "Arunad Yavanah Sāketam" ("The Yavanas (Greeks) were besieging Saketa")
- "Arunad Yavano Madhyamikām" ("The Yavanas were besieging Madhyamika" (the "Middle country")).

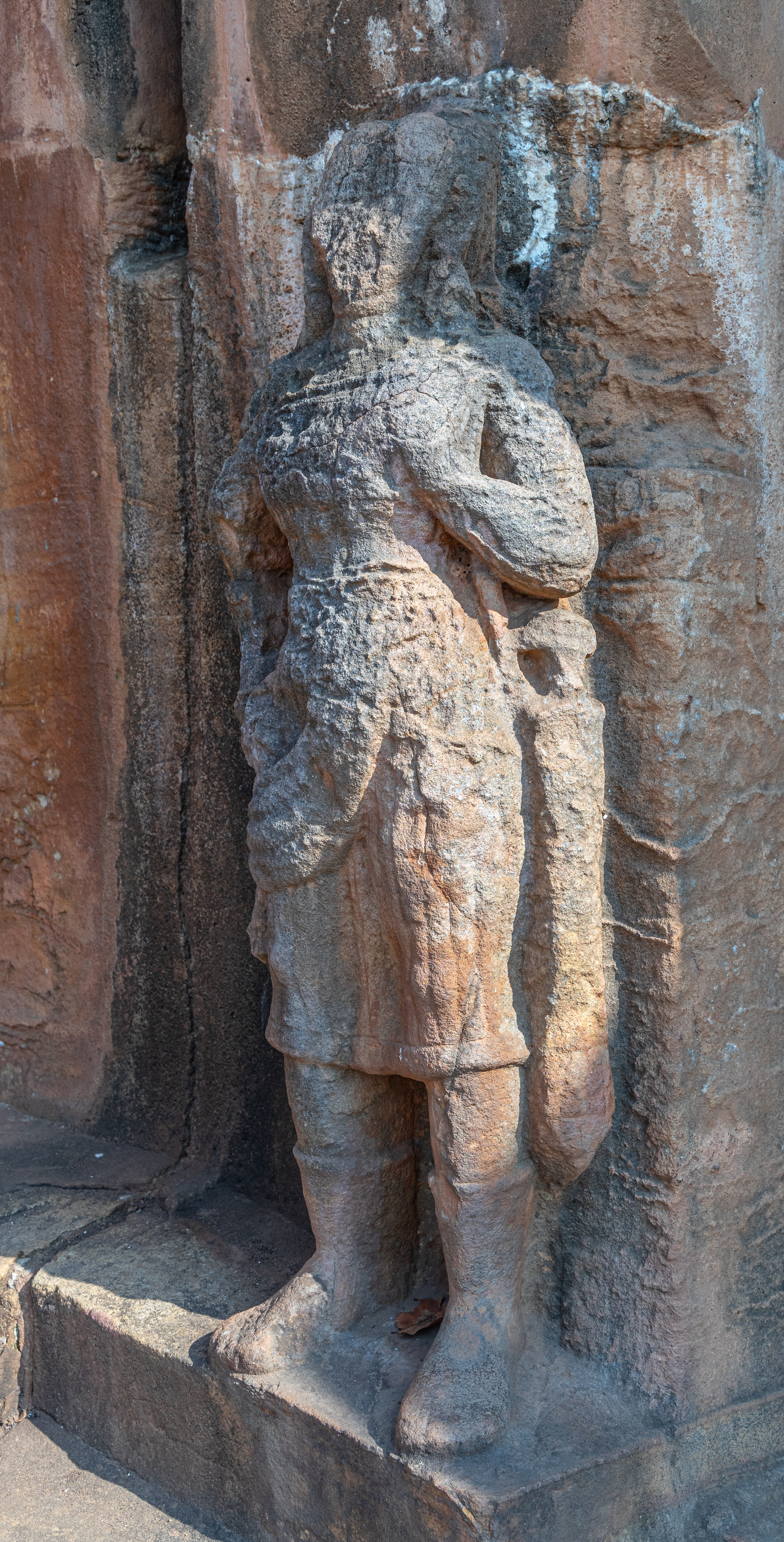
Possible statue of a Yavana/ Indo-Greek warrior with boots and chiton, from the Rani Gumpha or "Cave of the Queen" in the Udayagiri Caves on the east coast of India, where the Hathigumpha inscription was also found. 2nd or 1st century BC.

The Brahmanical text of the Yuga Purana describes events in the form of a prophecy, which may have been historical, relates the attack of the Indo-Greeks on the capital Pataliputra, a magnificent fortified city with 570 towers and 64 gates according to Megasthenes, and describes the ultimate destruction of the city's walls:

Then, after having approached Saketa together with the Panchalas and the Mathuras, the Yavanas, valiant in battle, will reach Kusumadhvaja ("The town of the flower-standard", Pataliputra). Then, once Puspapura (another name of Pataliputra) has been reached and its celebrated mud-walls cast down, all the realm will be in disorder.

— Yuga Purana, Paragraph 47–48, quoted in Mitchiner, The Yuga Purana, 2002 edition

Accounts of battles between the Greeks and the Shunga in Central India are also found in the Mālavikāgnimitram, a play by Kālidāsa which is thought to describe an encounter between a Greek cavalry squadron and Vasumitra, the grandson of Pushyamitra, during the latter's reign, by the Sindh River or the Kali Sindh River.

According to the Yuga Purana, the Yavanas thereafter will retreat following internal conflicts:

"The Yavanas (Greeks) will command, the Kings will disappear. (But ultimately) the Yavanas, intoxicated with fighting, will not stay in Madhadesa (the Middle Country); there will be undoubtedly a civil war among them, arising in their own country (Bactria), there will be a terrible and ferocious war." (Gargi-Samhita, Yuga Purana chapter, No7).

According to Mitchiner, the Hathigumpha inscription indicates the presence of the Indo-Greeks led by a ruler listed as "ta" from Mathura during the 1st century BCE. Although, the name of the king has been omitted and undeciphered. The remaining syllables [ta] has been disputed. It has been argued by Tarn to be referencing the ruler Demetrius. However this interpretation is disputed by other historians like Narain, which point out the discrepancies in chronology and the fact Demetrius didn't venture past Punjab. Instead most historians now theorize it to be the Indo-Greek ruler Menander I, or perhaps a later Yavana king from Mathura.

"Then in the eighth year, (Kharavela) with a large army having sacked Goradhagiri causes pressure on Rajagaha (Rajagriha). On account of the loud report of this act of valour, the Yavana (Greek) King Dimi[ta] retreated to Mathura having extricated his demoralized army."

— Hathigumpha inscription, line 8, probably in the 1st century BC. Original text is in Brahmi script.

But while this inscription may be interpreted as an indication that Demetrius I was the king who made conquests in Punjab, it is still true that he never issued any Indian-standard coins, only numerous coins with elephant symbolism, and the restoration of his name in Kharosthi on the Hathigumpha inscription: Di-Mi-Ta, has been doubted. The "Di" is a reconstruction, and it may be noted that the name of another Indo-Greek king, Amyntas, is spelt A-Mi-Ta in Kharosthi and may fit in.

Therefore, Menander remains the likeliest candidate for any advance east of Punjab.

Additional corroboration for mentions of Indo-Greek expeditions into the Gangetic Plains may be furnished by the Yavanarajya inscription discovered in Mathura, and discoveries of Menander's coins in western Uttar Pradesh including the Pachkhura hoard of coins unearthed near the Yamuna River in Hamirpur district, Uttar Pradesh, and the unearthing of a clay pot filled with coins of preceding kings (Diodotus I, Diodotus II, and Euthydemus I) in Vaishali district, Bihar.

=== Consolidation ===
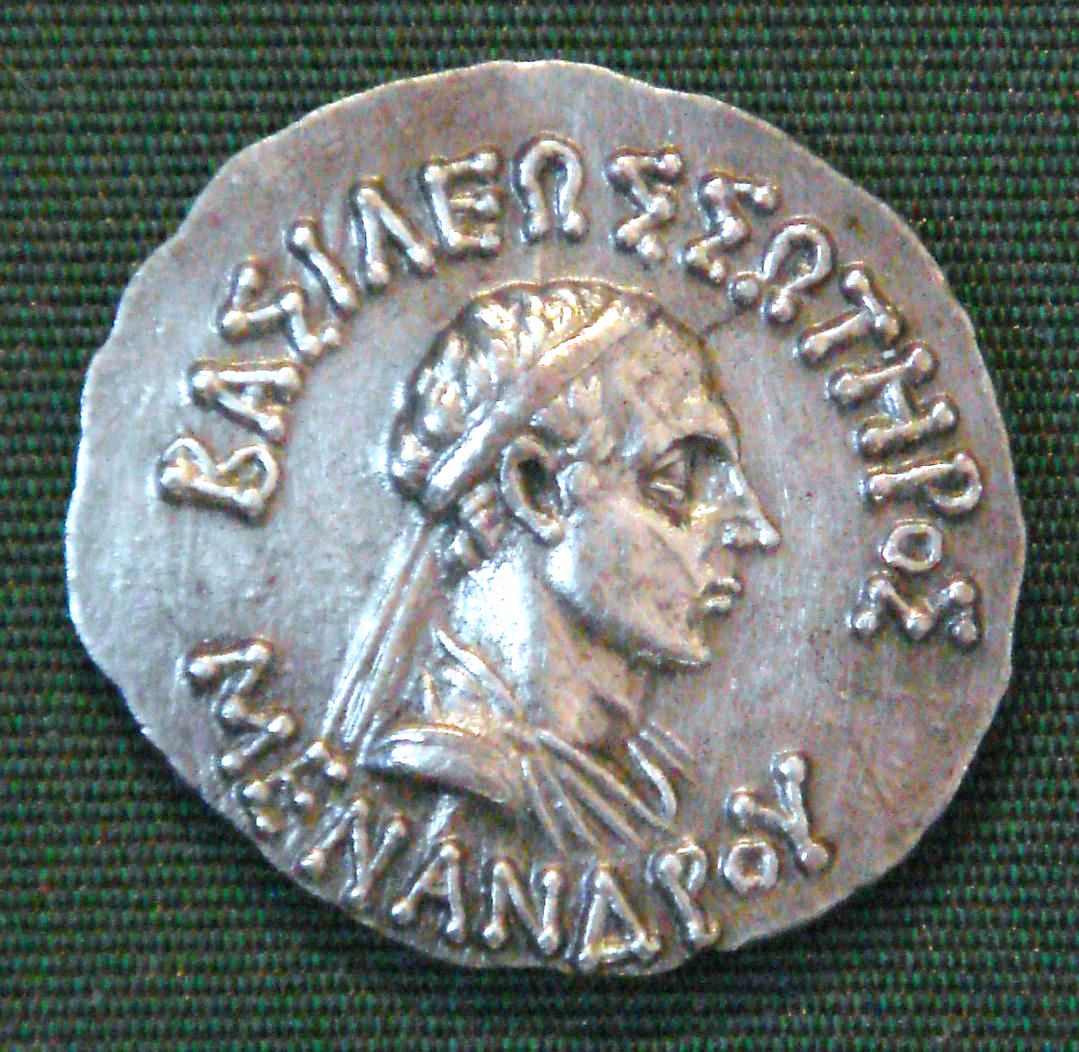
Menander I became the most important of the Indo-Greek rulers.

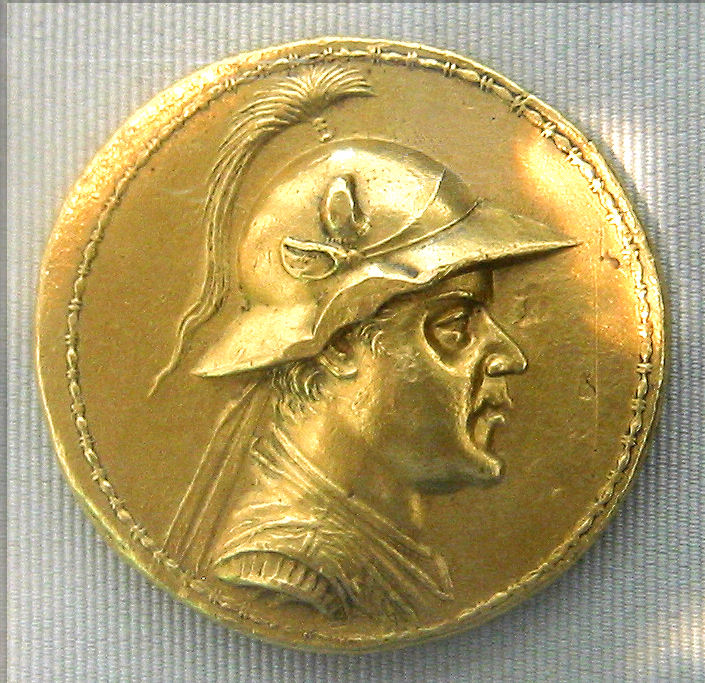
Eucratides I toppled the Greco-Bactrian Euthydemid dynasty, and attacked the Indo-Greeks from the west.

Menander is considered to have been probably the most successful Indo-Greek king, and the conqueror of the largest territory. The finds of his coins are the most numerous and the most widespread of all the Indo-Greek kings. Menander is also remembered in Buddhist literature, where he is called Milinda, and is described in the Milinda Panha as a convert to Buddhism: he became an arhat whose relics were enshrined in a manner reminiscent of the Buddha. He also introduced a new coin type, with Athena Alkidemos ("Protector of the people") on the reverse, which was adopted by most of his successors in the East.

==== Fall of Bactria and death of Menander ====
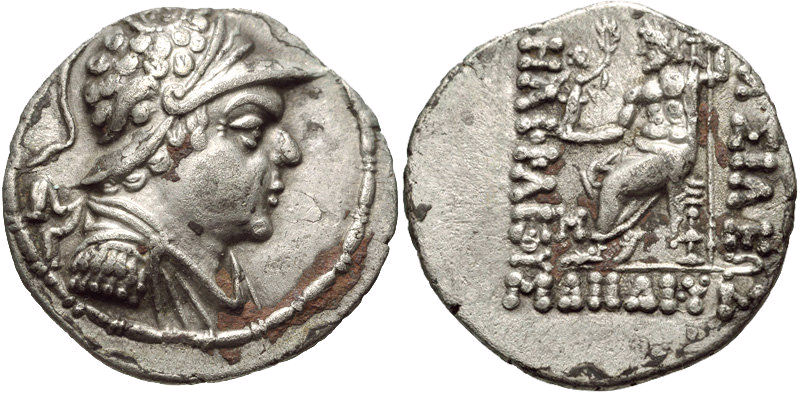
Heliocles (145–130 BC) was the last Greek king in Bactria.

From the mid-2nd century BC, the Scythians, in turn being pushed forward by the Yuezhi who were completing a long migration from the border of China, started to invade Bactria from the north. Around 130 BC the last Greco-Bactrian king Heliocles was probably killed during the invasion and the Greco-Bactrian kingdom proper ceased to exist. The Parthians also probably played a role in the downfall of the Bactrian kingdom.

Immediately after the fall of Bactria, the bronze coins of Indo-Greek king Zoilos I (130–120 BC), successor of Menander in the western part of the Indian territories, combined the club of Herakles with a Scythian-type bowcase and short recurve bow inside a victory wreath, illustrating interaction with horse-mounted people originating from the steppes, possibly either the Scythians (future Indo-Scythians), or the Yuezhi (future Kushans) who had invaded Greco-Bactria. This bow can be contrasted to the traditional Hellenistic long bow depicted on the coins of the eastern Indo-Greek queen Agathokleia. It is now known that 50 years later, the Indo-Scythian Maues was in alliance with the Indo-Greek kings in Taxila, and one of those kings, Artemidoros seems to claim on his coins that he is the son of Maues, although this is now disputed.

==== Preservation of the Indo-Greek realm ====
The extent of Indo-Greek rule is still uncertain and disputed. Probable members of the dynasty of Menander include the ruling queen Agathokleia, her son Strato I, and Nicias, though it is uncertain whether they ruled directly after Menander.

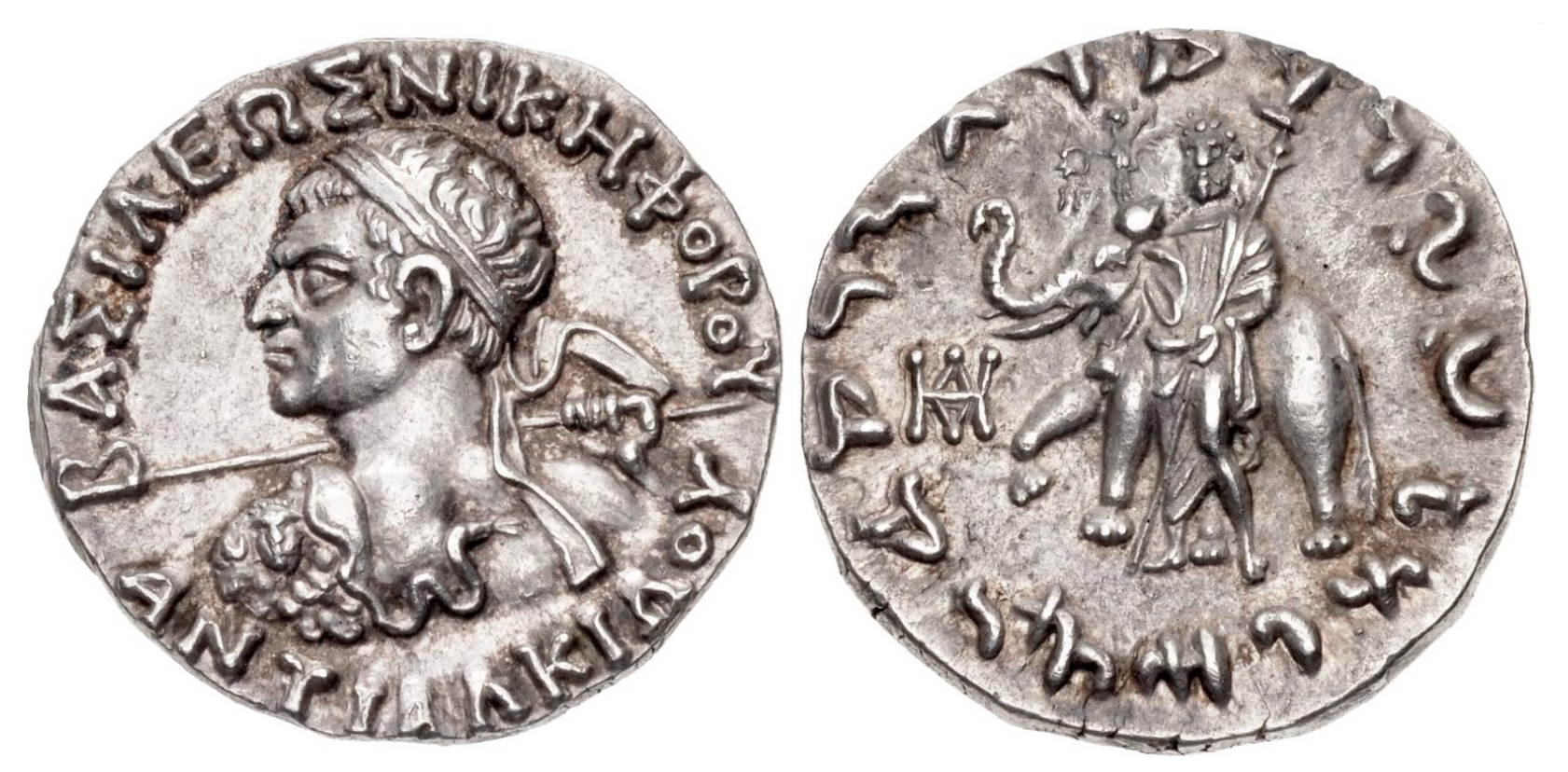
Coin of Antialcidas (105–95 BC). The obverse with Greek inscription: ΒΑΣΙΛΕΩΣ ΝΙΚΗΦΟΡΟΥ ΑΝΤΙΑΛΚΙΔΟΥ "Of Victorious King Antialcidas". The reverse with the Kharosthi inscription: Maharajasa Jayadharasa Antialikitasa, "Of Great Victorious King Antialcidas"

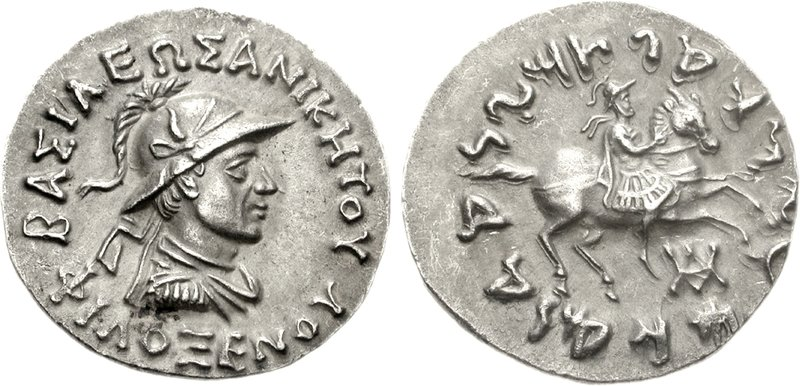
Coin of Philoxenus (100–95 BC). The obverse with the Greek inscription: ΒΑΣΙΛΕΩΣ ΑΝΙΚΗΤΟΥ ΦΙΛΟΞΕΝΟΥ, "Of the Invincible King Philoxenus". The reverse with the Kharosthi inscription: Maharajasa Apadihatasa Philasinasa, "Of Great Invincible King Philoxenus".

Other kings emerged, usually in the western part of the Indo-Greek realm, such as Zoilos I, Lysias, Antialcidas and Philoxenus. These rulers may have been relatives of either the Eucratid or the Euthydemid dynasties. The names of later kings were often new (members of Hellenistic dynasties usually inherited family names) but old reverses and titles were frequently repeated by the later rulers.

Immediately after the fall of Bactria, the bronze coins of Indo-Greek king Zoilos I (130–120 BC), successor of Menander in the western part of the Indian territories, combined the club of Herakles with a Scythian-type bowcase and short recurve bow inside a victory wreath, illustrating interaction with horse-mounted people originating from the steppes, possibly either the Scythians (future Indo-Scythians), or the Yuezhi (future Kushans) who had invaded Greco-Bactria. This bow can be contrasted to the traditional Hellenistic long bow depicted on the coins of the eastern Indo-Greek queen Agathokleia. It is now known that 50 years later, the Indo-Scythian Maues was in alliance with the Indo-Greek kings in Taxila, and one of those kings, Artemidoros seems to claim on his coins that he is the son of Maues, although this is now disputed.

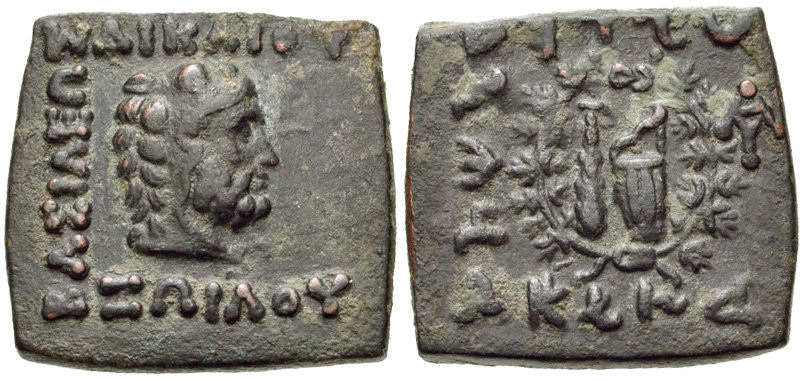
Coin of Zoilos I (130–120 BC) showing on the reverse the Heraklean club with the Scythian bow, inside a victory wreath.

While all Indo-Greek kings after Apollodotus I mainly issued bilingual (Greek and Kharoshti) coins for circulation in their own territories, several of them also struck rare Greek coins which have been found in Bactria. The later kings probably struck these coins as some kind of payment to the Scythian or Yuezhi tribes who now ruled there, though if as tribute or payment for mercenaries remains unknown. For some decades after the Bactrian invasion, relationships seem to have been peaceful between the Indo-Greeks and these relatively hellenised nomad tribes.

=== Interactions with Indian culture and religions ===
==== Indo-Greeks in the regions of Vidisha and Sanchi (115 BC) ====
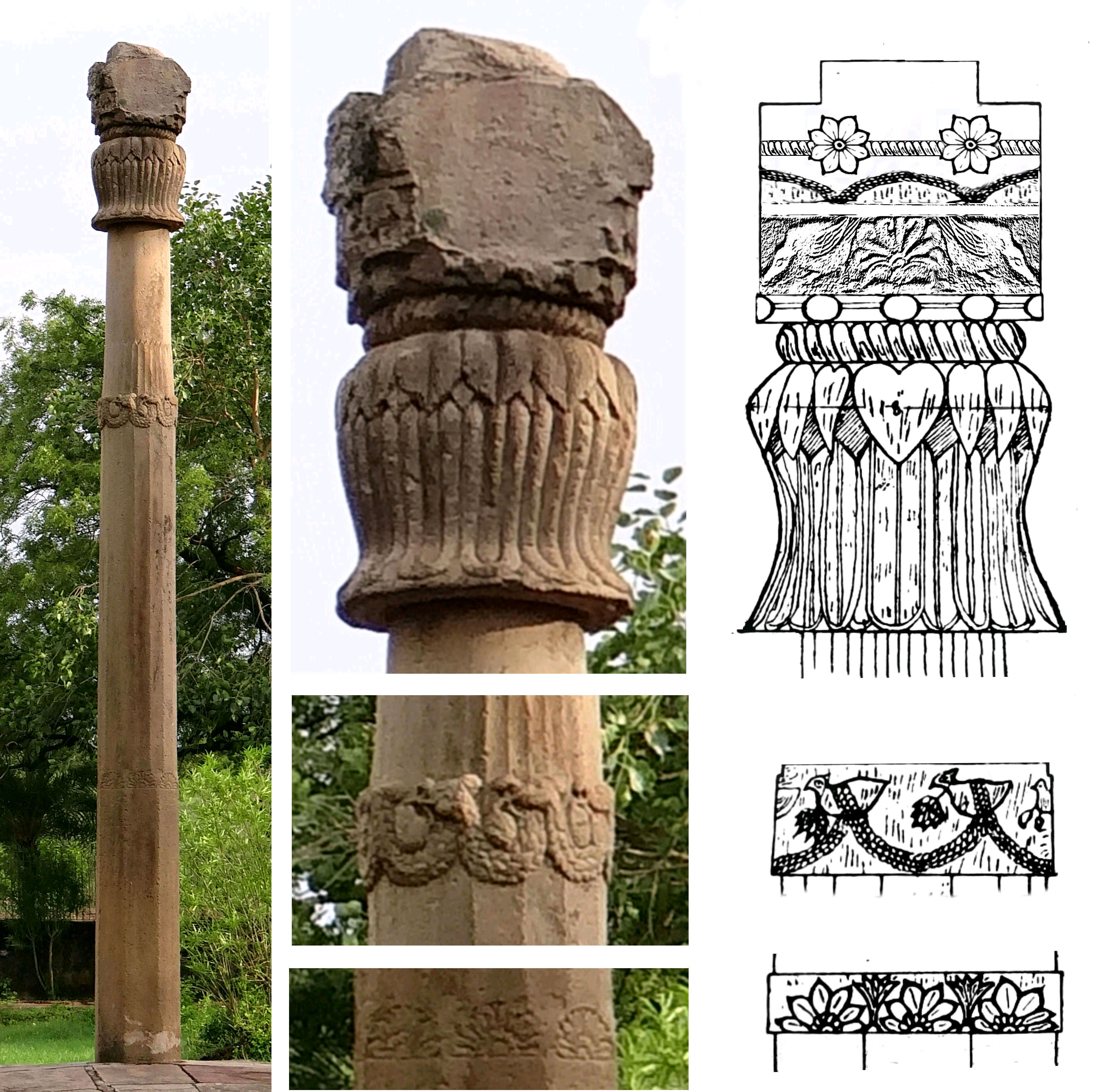
The Heliodorus pillar, commissioned by Indo-Greek ambassador Heliodorus, is the first known inscription related to Vaishnavism in India. Heliodurus was one of the earliest recorded Indo-Greek converts to Hinduism.

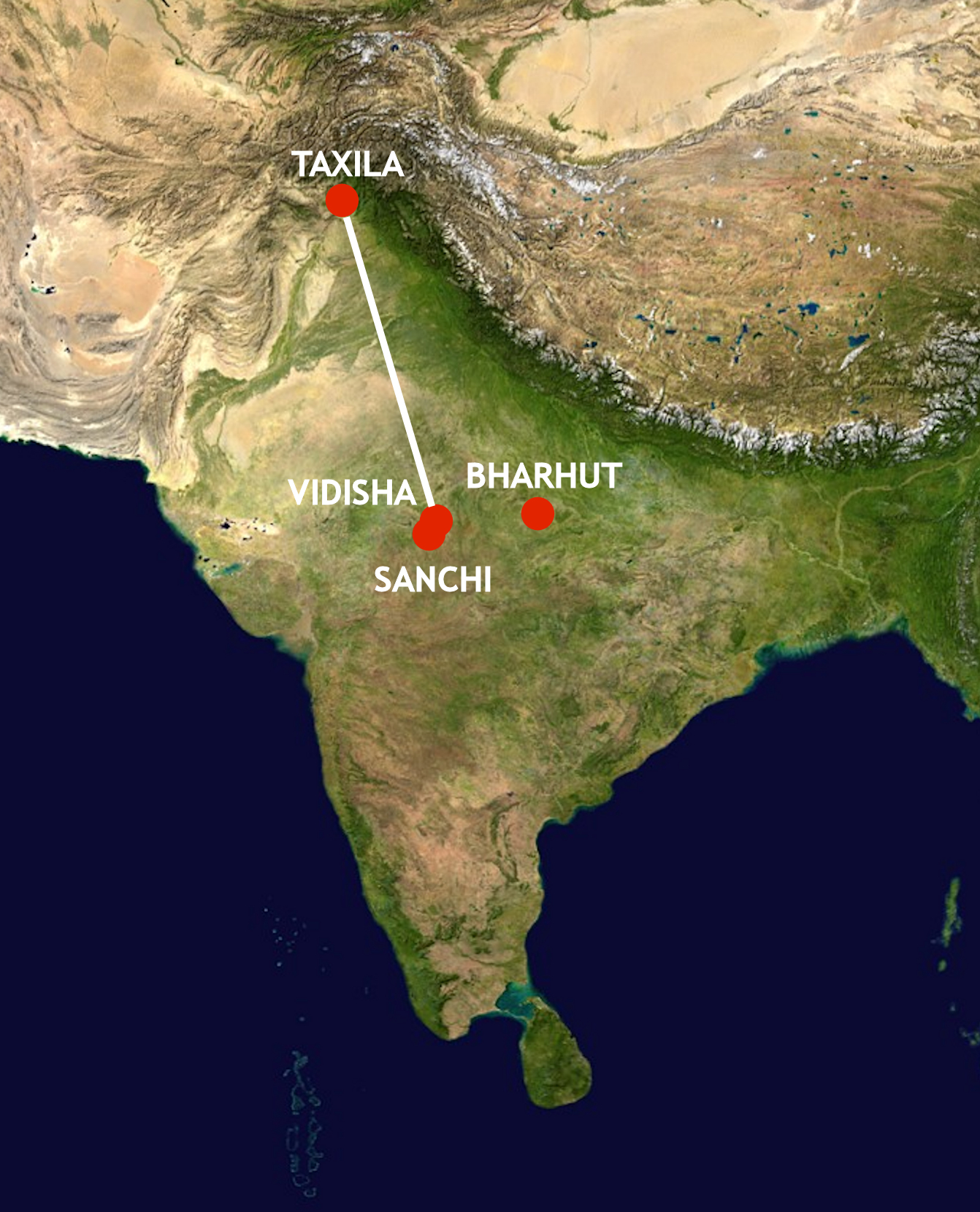
Heliodorus travelled from Taxila to Vidisha as an ambassador of king Antialkidas, and erected the Heliodorus pillar.

Vidisha

It is around this time, in 115 BC, that the embassy of Heliodorus, from king Antialkidas to the court of the Sungas king Bhagabhadra in Vidisha, is recorded. In the Sunga capital, Heliodorus established the Heliodorus pillar in a dedication to Vāsudeva. This would indicate that relations between the Indo-Greeks and the Sungas had improved by that time, that people traveled between the two realms, and also that the Indo-Greeks readily followed Indian religions.

Sanchi

Also around the same period, circa 115 BC, decorative reliefs were introduced for the first time at nearby Sanchi, 6 km away from Vidisha, by craftsmen from the northwest. These craftsmen left mason's marks in Kharoshthi, mainly used in the area around Gandhara, as opposed to the local Brahmi script. This seems to imply that these foreign workers were responsible for some of the earliest motifs and figures that can be found on the railings of the stupa. These early reliefs at Sanchi, (those of Sanchi Stupa No.2), are dated to 115 BC, while the more extensive pillar carvings are dated to 80 BC. These reliefs have been described as "the oldest extensive stupa decoration in existence". They are considered the origin of Jataka illustrations in India.

Early reliefs at Sanchi, Stupa No.2 (circa 115 BC)
Sanchi, Stupa No 2 Mason's marks in Kharoshti point to craftsmen from the north-west (region of Gandhara) for the earliest reliefs at Sanchi, circa 115 BC.	Foreigner on a horse. The medallions are dated circa 115 BC. Lakshmi with lotus and two child attendants, probably derived from similar images of Venus Griffin. Female riding a Centaur. Lotus within Hellenistic beads and reels motif. Floral motif.

==== Indo-Greeks and Bharhut (100-75 BC) ====
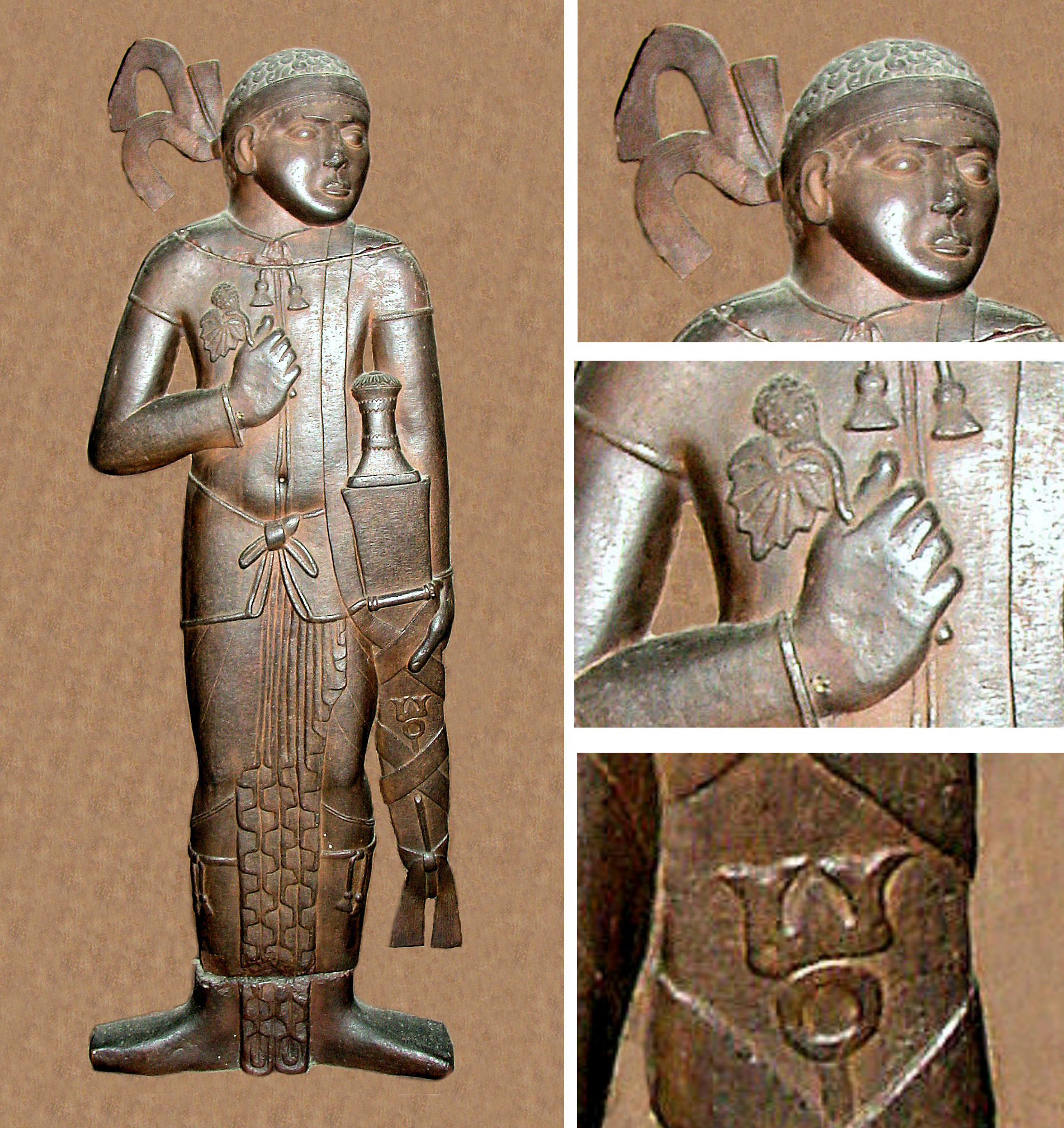
The Bharhut Yavana, a possible Indian depiction of Menander, with the flowing head band of a Greek king, northern tunic with Hellenistic pleats, and Buddhist triratana symbol on his sword. Bharhut, 100 BC. Indian Museum, Calcutta.

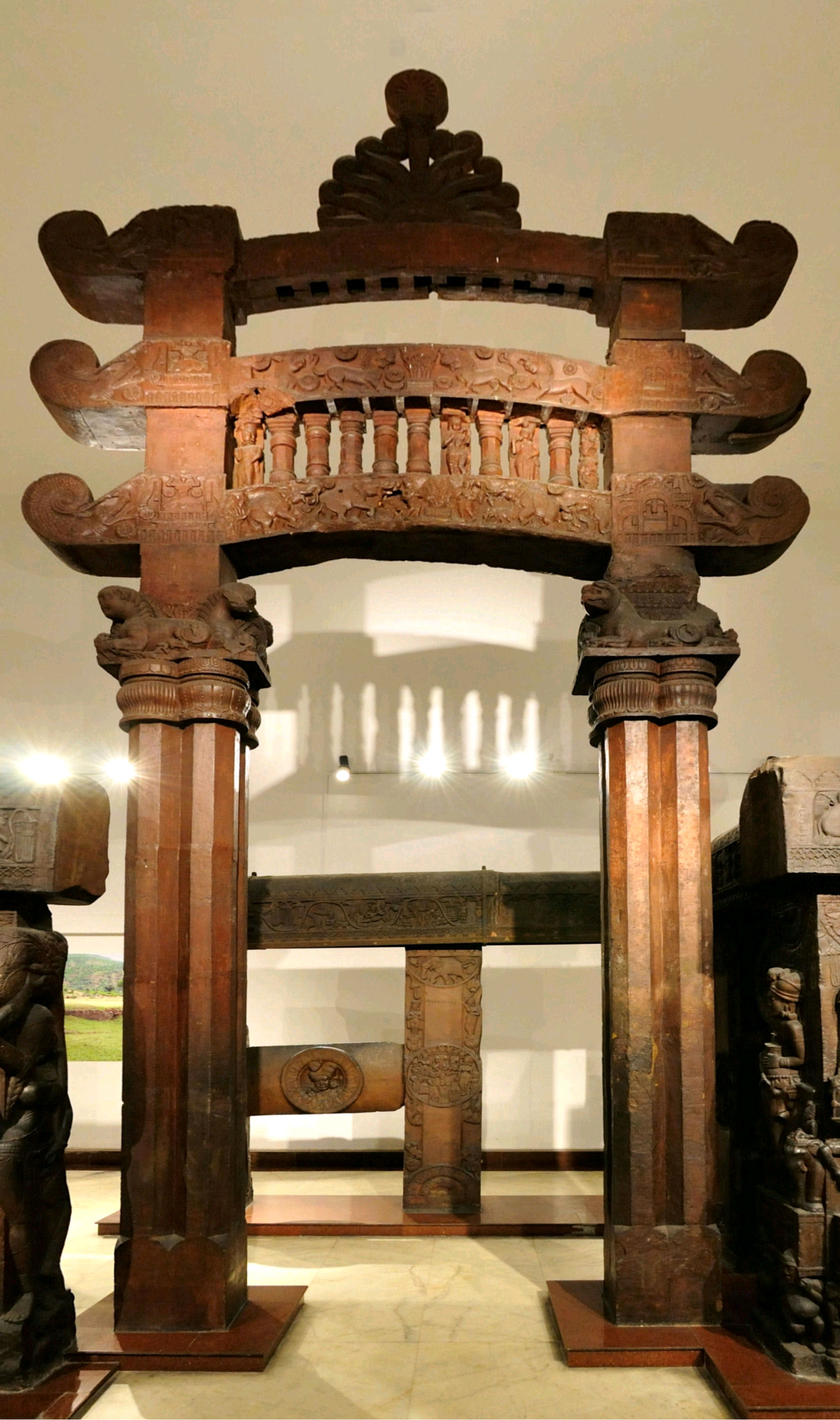
At Bharhut, the gateways were made by northwestern (probably Gandharan) masons using Kharosthi marks 100-75 BC.

A warrior figure, the Bharhut Yavana, appeared prominently on a high relief on the railings of the stupa of Bharhut circa 100 BC. The warrior has the flowing head band of a Greek king, a northern tunic with Hellenistic pleats, he hold a grape in his hand, and has a Buddhist triratana symbol on his sword. He has the role of a dvarapala, a Guardian of the entrance of the Stupa. The warrior has been described as a Greek, Some have suggested that he might even represent king Menander.

Also around that time, craftsmen from the Gandhara area are known to have been involved in the construction of the Buddhist torana gateways at Bharhut, which are dated to 100–75 BC: this is because mason's marks in Kharosthi have been found on several elements of the Bharhut remains, indicating that some of the builders at least came from the north, particularly from Gandhara where the Kharoshti script was in use.

Cunningham explained that the Kharosthi letters were found on the balusters between the architraves of the gateway, but none on the railings which all had Indian markings, summarizing that the gateways, which are artistically more refined, must have been made by artists from the North, whereas the railings were made by local artists.

==== Sanchi Yavanas (50–1 BC) ====
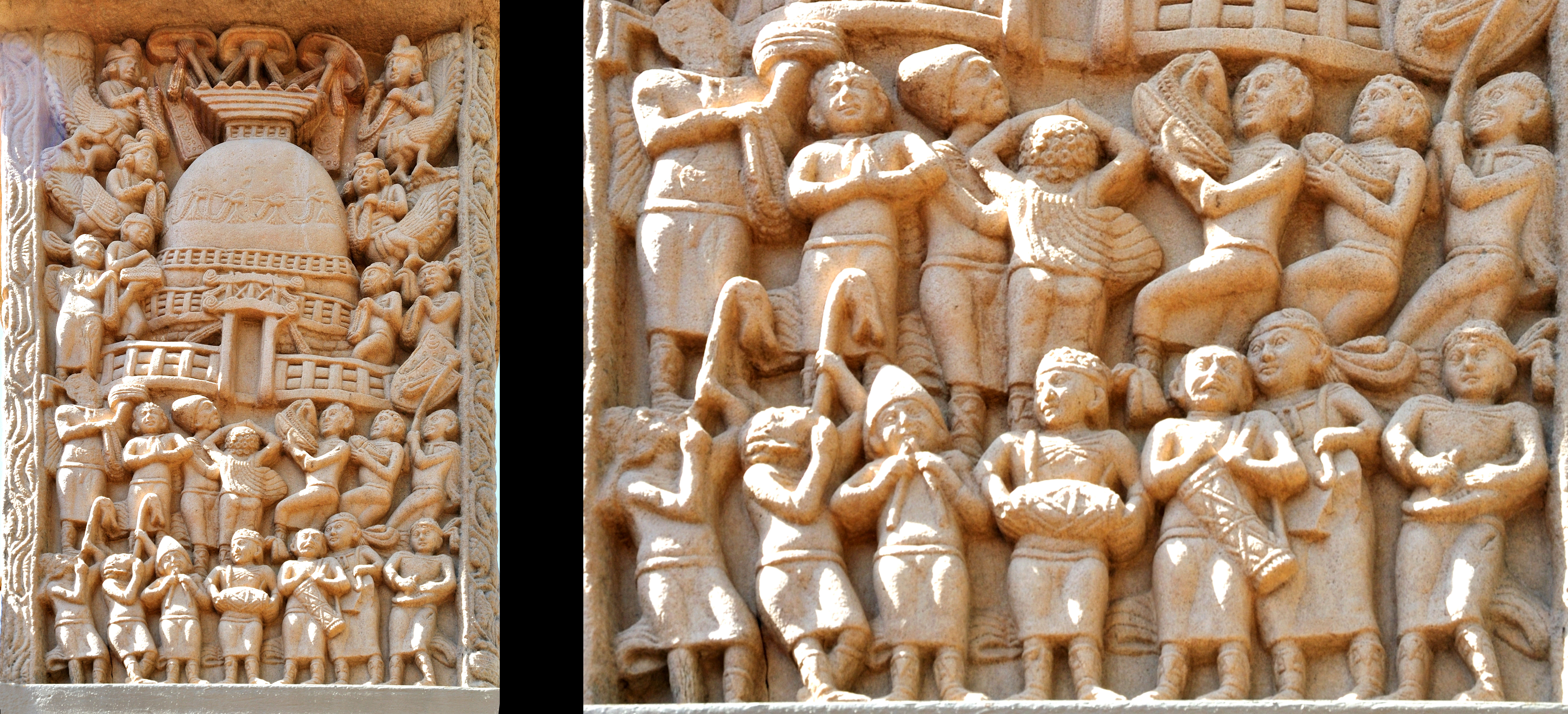
Foreigners on the Northern Gateway of Stupa I at Sanchi.

Again in Sanchi, but this time dating to the period of Satavahana rule circa 50–1 BC, one frieze can be observed which shows devotees in Greek attire making a dedication to the Great Stupa of Sanchi. The official notice at Sanchi describes "Foreigners worshiping Stupa". The men are depicted with short curly hair, often held together with a headband of the type commonly seen on Greek coins. The clothing too is Greek, complete with tunics, cloaks, and sandals, typical of the Greek travelling costume. The musical instruments are also quite characteristic, such as the double flute called aulos. Also visible are carnyx-like horns. They are all celebrating at the entrance of the stupa.

The actual participation of Yavanas/Yonas (Greek donors) to the construction of Sanchi is known from three inscriptions made by self-declared Yavana donors:

- The clearest of these reads "Setapathiyasa Yonasa danam" ("Gift of the Yona of Setapatha"), Setapatha being an uncertain city, possibly a location near Nasik, a place where other dedications by Yavanas are known, in cave No.17 of the Nasik Caves complex, and on the pillars of the Karla Caves not far away.
- A second similar inscription on a pillar reads: "[Sv]etapathasa (Yona?)sa danam", with probably the same meaning, ("Gift of the Yona of Setapatha").
- The third inscription, on two adjacent pavement slabs reads "Cuda yo[vana]kasa bo silayo" ("Two slabs of Cuda, the Yonaka").

=== Decline ===
Main polities in Asia, circa -100

King Philoxenus (100–95 BC) briefly occupied the whole Greek territory from the Paropamisadae to Western Punjab, after that the territories fragmented again between smaller Indo-Greek kings. Throughout the 1st century BC, the Indo-Greeks progressively lost ground to the Indians in the east, and the Scythians, the Yuezhi, and the Parthians in the West. About 20 Indo-Greek kings are known during this period, down to the last known Indo-Greek rulers, Strato II and Strato III, who ruled in the Punjab region until around 10 AD.

==== Loss of Hindu Kush territories (70 BC–) ====
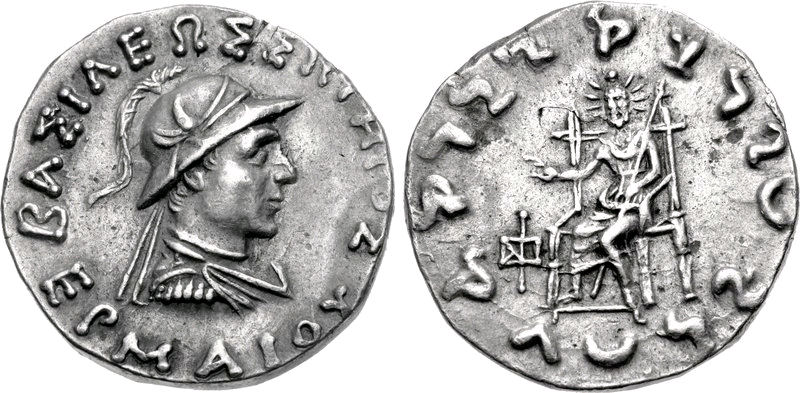
Hermaeus (90–70 BC) was the last Indo-Greek king in the Western territories (Paropamisadae).

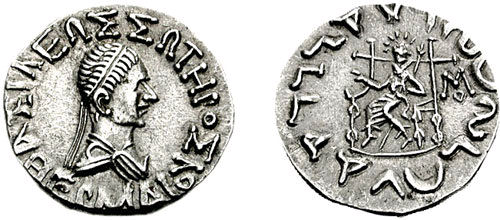
Hermaeus posthumous issue struck by Indo-Scythians near Kabul, circa 80–75 BC.

Around eight "western" Indo-Greek kings are known; most of them are distinguished by their issues of Attic coins for circulation in the neighbouring region.

One of the last important kings in the Paropamisadae (part of the Hindu Kush) was Hermaeus, who ruled until around 80 BC; soon after his death the Yuezhi or Sakas took over his areas from neighbouring Bactria. When Hermaeus is depicted on his coins riding a horse, he is equipped with the recurve bow and bow-case of the steppes and RC Senior believes him to be of partly nomad origin. The later king Hippostratus may however also have held territories in the Paropamisadae.

After the death of Hermaeus, the Yuezhi or Saka nomads became the new rulers of the Paropamisadae, and minted vast quantities of posthumous issues of Hermaeus up to around 40 AD, when they blend with the coinage of the Kushan king Kujula Kadphises. The first documented Yuezhi prince, Sapadbizes, ruled around 20 BC, and minted in Greek and in the same style as the western Indo-Greek kings, probably depending on Greek mints and chelators.

==== Loss of Central territories (48/47 BC) ====
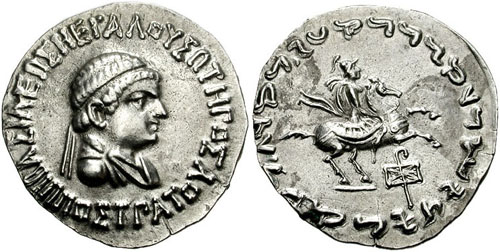
Tetradrachm of Hippostratos, reigned circa 65–55 BC, was the last Indo-Greek king in Western Punjab.

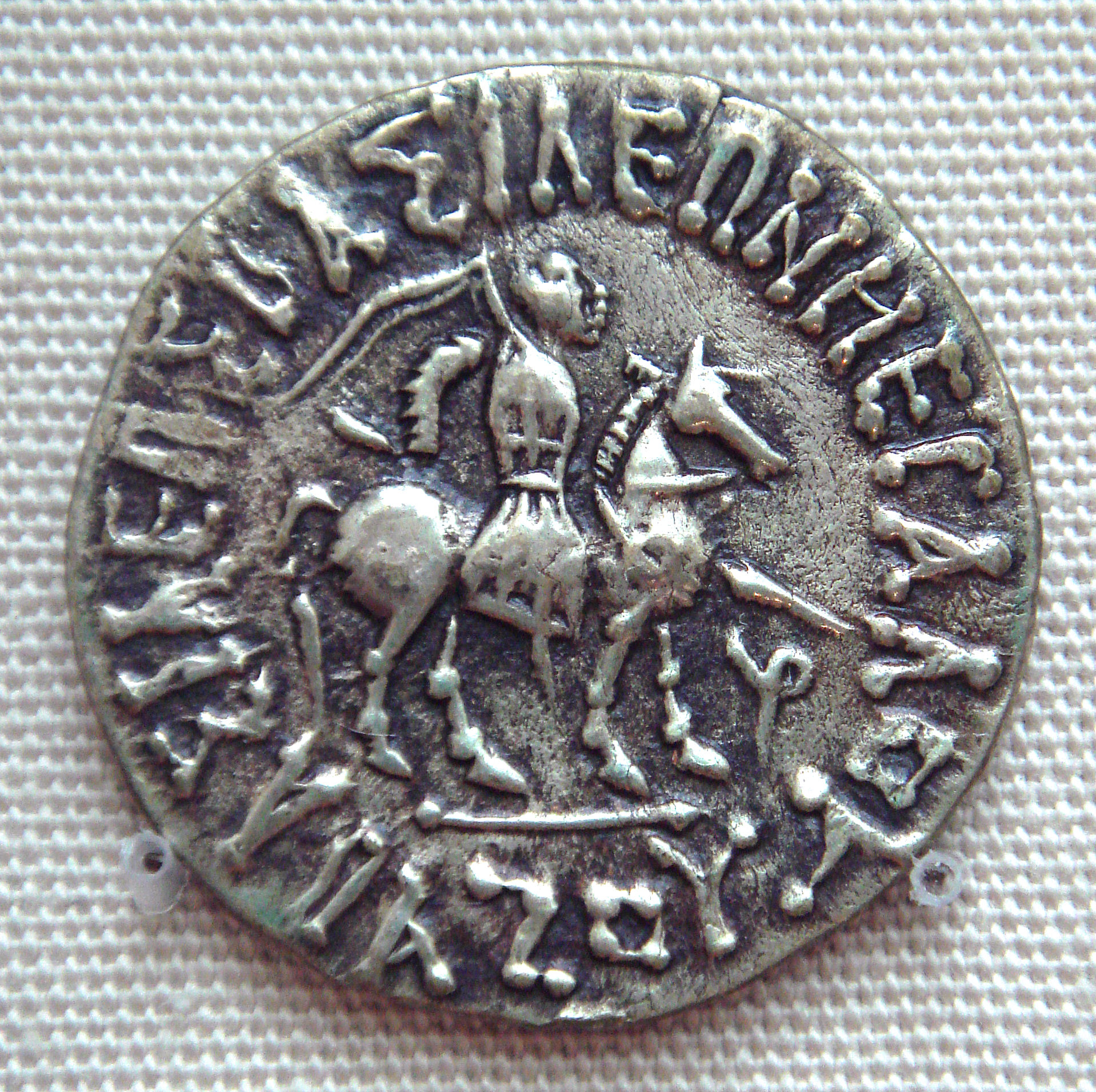
Hippostratos was replaced by the Indo-Scythian king Azes I (r. c. 35–12 BC).

Around 80 BC, an Indo-Scythian king named Maues, possibly a general in the service of the Indo-Greeks, ruled for a few years in northwestern India before the Indo-Greeks again took control. He seems to have been married to an Indo-Greek princess named Machene. King Hippostratus (65–55 BC) seems to have been one of the most successful subsequent Indo-Greek kings until he lost to the Indo-Scythian Azes I, who established an Indo-Scythian dynasty in 48/47 BC. (Note: G.K. Jenkins, using overstrikes and monograms, showed that, contrary to what Narai would write two years later, Apollodotus II and Hippostratus were posterior, by far, to Maues. (...) He reveals an overstike if Azes I over Hippostratus. (...) Apollodotus and Hippostratus are thus posterior to Maues and anterior to Azes I, whose era we now starts in 57 BC." Bopearachchi, p. 126-127.) Various coins seem to suggest that some sort of alliance may have taken place between the Indo-Greeks and the Scythians. (Note: "It is curious that on his copper Zoilos used a bow and quiver as a type. A quiver was a badge used by the Parthians (Scythians) and had been used previously by Diodotos, who we know had made a treaty with them. Did Zoilos use Scythian mercenaries in his quest against Menander perhaps?" Senior, Indo-Scythian coins, p. xxvii)

Although the Indo-Scythians clearly ruled militarily and politically, they remained surprisingly respectful of Greek and Indian cultures. Their coins were minted in Greek mints, continued using proper Greek and Kharoshthi legends, and incorporated depictions of Greek deities, particularly Zeus. The Mathura lion capital inscription attests that they adopted the Buddhist faith, as do the depictions of deities forming the vitarka mudra on their coins. Greek communities, far from being exterminated, probably persisted under Indo-Scythian rule. There is a possibility that a fusion, rather than a confrontation, occurred between the Greeks and the Indo-Scythians: in a recently published coin, Artemidorus seems to present himself as "son of Maues" (but this is now disputed), and the Buner reliefs show Indo-Greeks and Indo-Scythians reveling in a Buddhist context.

The last known mention of an Indo-Greek ruler is suggested by an inscription on a signet ring of the 1st century AD in the name of a king Theodamas, from the Bajaur area of Gandhara, in modern Pakistan. No coins of him are known, but the signet bears in kharoshthi script the inscription "Su Theodamasa", "Su" being explained as the Greek transliteration of the ubiquitous Kushan royal title "Shau" ("Shah", "King").

==== Loss of Eastern territories (10 AD) ====
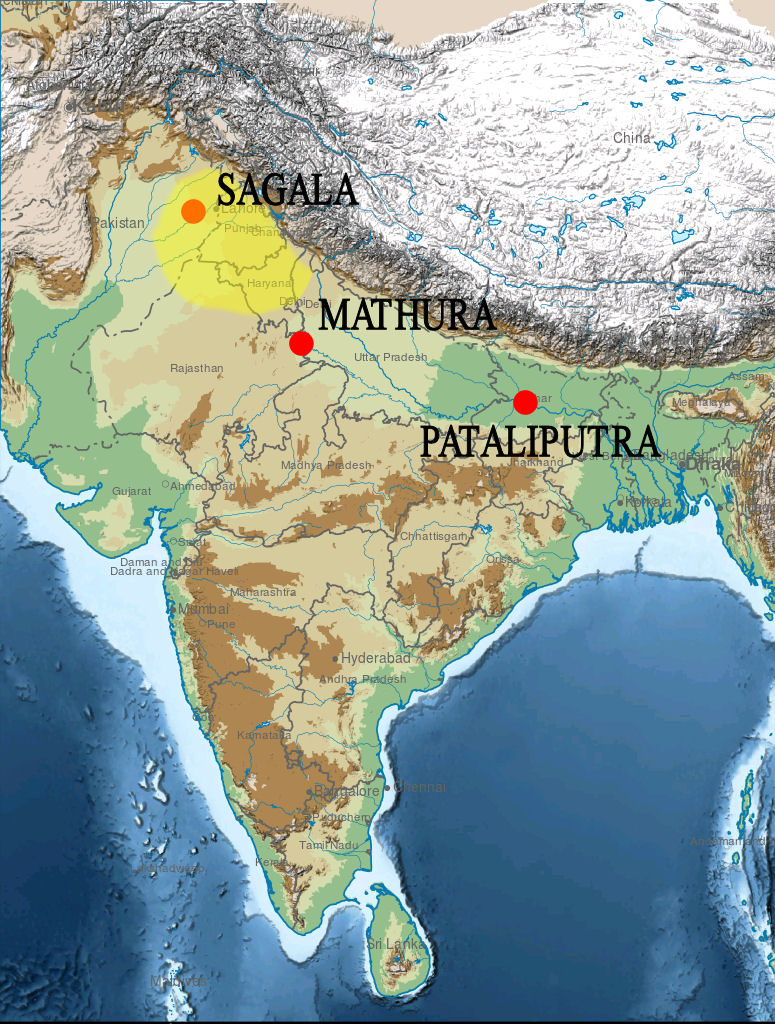
Approximate region of East Punjab and Strato II's capital Sagala.

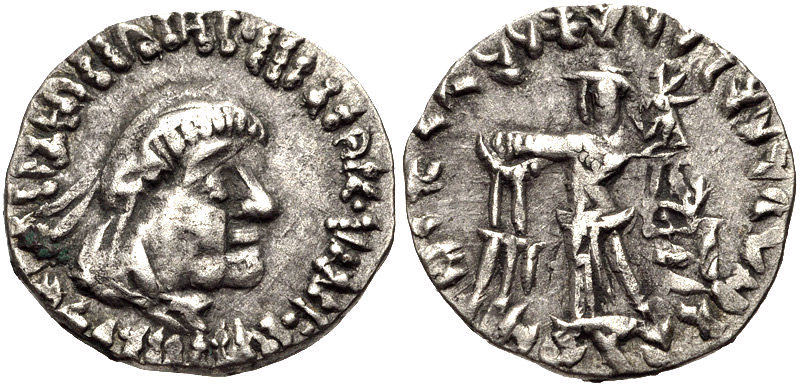
The last known Indo-Greek kings Strato II and Strato III, here on a joint coin (25 BC-10 AD), were the last Indo-Greek king in eastern territories of Eastern Punjab.

The Indo-Greek kingdoms lost most of their eastern territories in the 1st century BC following the death of Menander. The Arjunayanas and the Yaudheya Republic mention military victories on their coins ("Victory of the Arjunayanas", "Victory of the Yaudheyas"). These entities would remain independent until being conquered by the Saka King Rudradaman I of the Western Satraps.

Rudradaman (...) who by force destroyed the Yaudheyas who were loath to submit, rendered proud as they were by having manifested their' title of' heroes among all Kshatriyas.

— Junagadh rock inscription of Rudradaman

They would again win independence until being conquered by Samudragupta (350-375 CE) of the Gupta Empire, and would disintegrate soon after.

During the 1st century BC, the Trigartas, Audumbaras and finally the Kunindas also started to mint their own coins, usually in a style highly reminiscent of Indo-Greek coinage.

The Yavanas may have ruled as far as the area of Mathura from the time of Menander I until the middle of the 1st century BC: the Maghera inscription, from a village near Mathura, records the dedication of a well "in the one hundred and sixteenth year of the reign of the Yavanas", which corresponds to circa 70 BC. In the 1st century BC, however, they lost the area of Mathura, either to the Mitra rulers under the Shunga Empire or to the Datta dynasty.

Fleeing the Sakas in the west, the Indo-Greeks continued to rule a territory in the eastern Punjab. The kingdom of the last Indo-Greek kings Strato II and Strato III was conquered by the Northern Satrap Saka ruler Rajuvula around 10 AD.

=== Later contributions ===
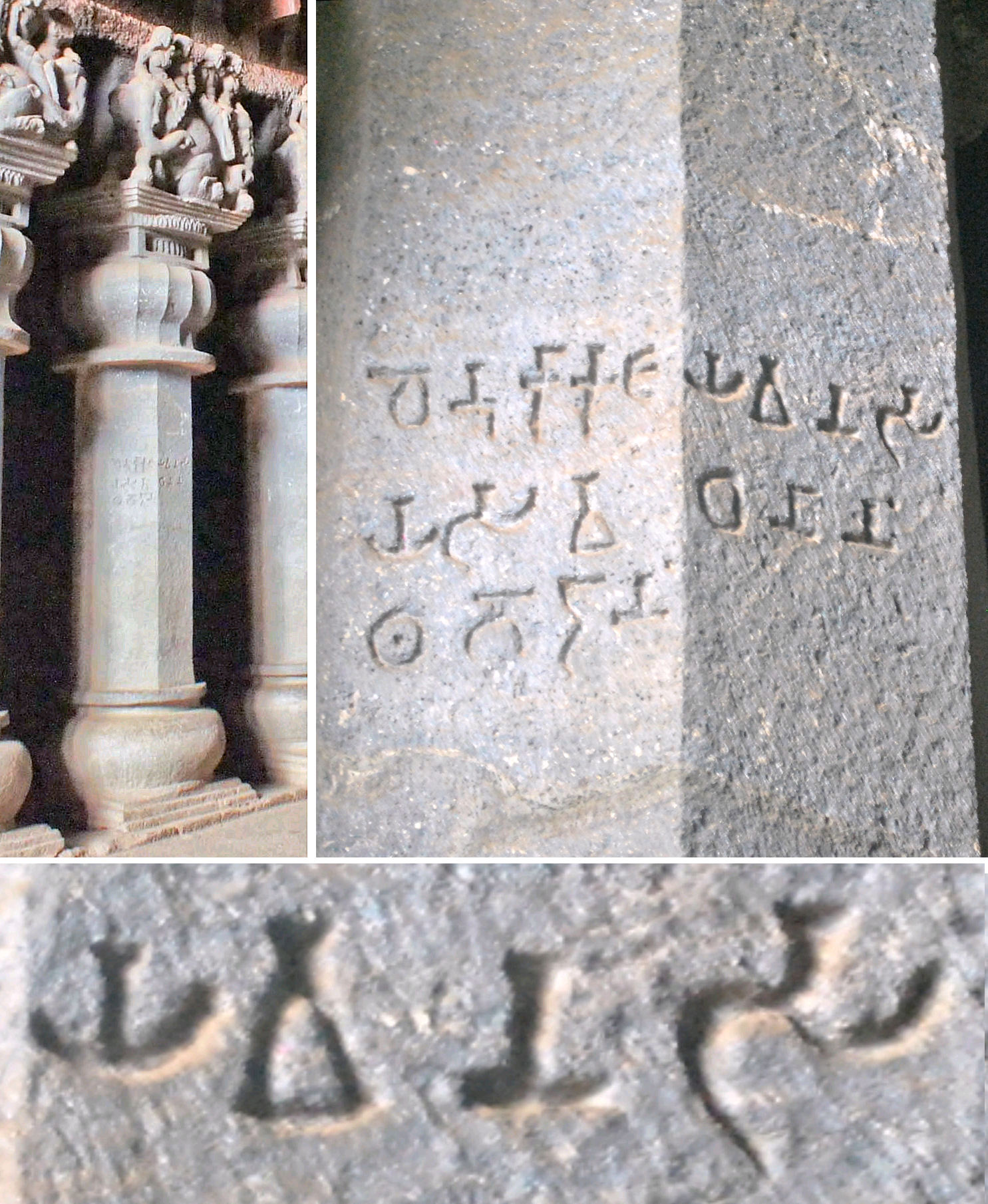
Pillar of the Great Chaitya at Karla Caves, mentioning its donation by a Yavana. Below: detail of the word "Ya-va-na-sa" in old Brahmi script:, circa AD 120.

Some Greek nuclei may have continued to survive until the 2nd century AD.

Nahapana had at his court a Greek writer named Yavanesvara ("Lord of the Greeks"), who translated from Greek to Sanskrit the Yavanajataka ("Saying of the Greeks"), an astrological treatise and India's earliest Sanskrit work in horoscopy.

==== Buddhist caves ====
A large number of Buddhist caves in India, particularly in the west of the country, were artistically hewn between the 1st century BC and the 2nd century AD. Numerous donors provided the funds for the building of these caves and left donatory inscriptions, including laity, members of the clergy, government officials. Foreigners, mostly self-declared Yavanas, represented about 8% of all inscriptions.

Karla Caves

Yavanas from the region of Nashik are mentioned as donors for six structural pillars in the Great Buddhist Chaitya of the Karla Caves built and dedicated by Western Satraps ruler Nahapana in 120 AD, although they seem to have adopted Buddhist names. In total, the Yavanas account for nearly half of the known dedicatory inscriptions on the pillars of the Great Chaitya. To this day, Nasik is known as the wine capital of India, using grapes that were probably originally imported by the Greeks.

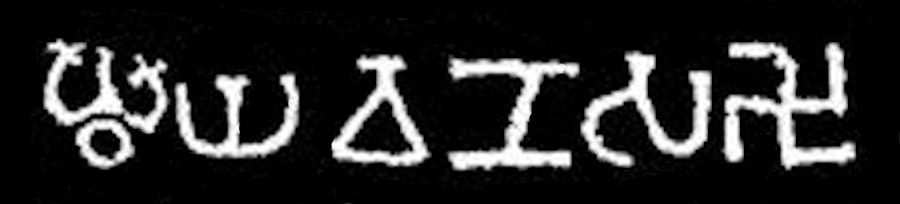
The Buddhist symbols of the triratna and of the swastika (reversed) around the word "Ya-va-ṇa-sa" in Brahmi. Shivneri Caves 1st century AD.

Shivneri Caves

Two more Buddhist inscriptions by Yavanas were found in the Shivneri Caves. One of the inscriptions mentions the donation of a tank by the Yavana named Irila, while the other mentions the gift of a refectory to the Sangha by the Yavana named Cita. On this second inscription, the Buddhist symbols of the triratna and of the swastika (reversed) are positioned on both sides of the first word "Yavana(sa)".

Pandavleni Caves

One of the Buddhist caves (Cave No.17) in the Pandavleni Caves complex near Nashik was built and dedicated by "Indragnidatta the son of the Yavana Dharmadeva, a northerner from Dattamittri", in the 2nd century AD. The city of "Dattamittri" is thought to be the city of Demetrias in Arachosia, mentioned by Isidore of Charax.

The "Yavana cave", Cave No.17 of Pandavleni Caves, near Nashik (2nd century AD)

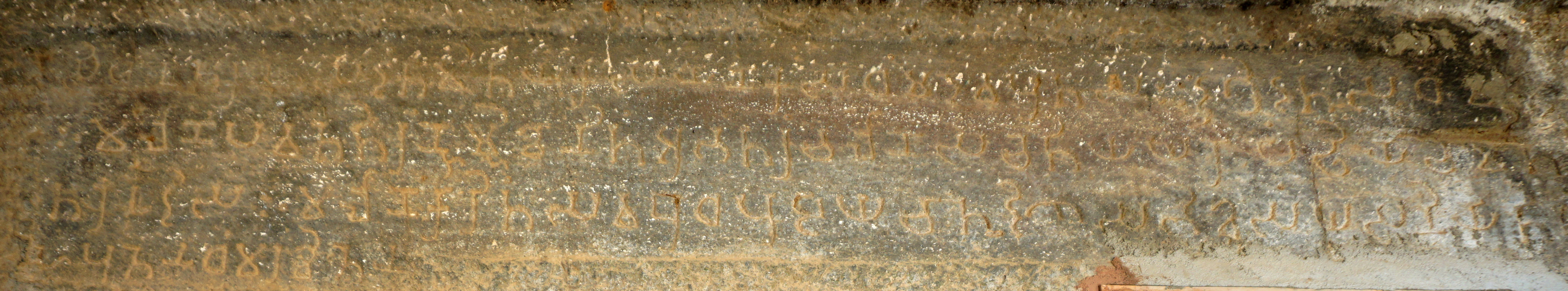
The "Yavana" inscription on the back wall of the veranda, Cave No.17, Nashik.

Cave No.17 has one inscription, mentioning the gift of the cave by Indragnidatta the son of the Yavana (i.e. Greek or Indo-Greek) Dharmadeva:

"Success! (The gift) of Indragnidatta, son of Dhammadeva, the Yavana, a northerner from Dattamittri. By him, inspired by true religion, this cave has been caused to be excavated in mount Tiranhu, and inside the cave a Chaitya and cisterns. This cave made for the sake of his father and mother has been, in order to honor all Buddhas bestowed on the universal Samgha by monks together with his son Dhammarakhita."

Inscription of Cave No.17, Nashik

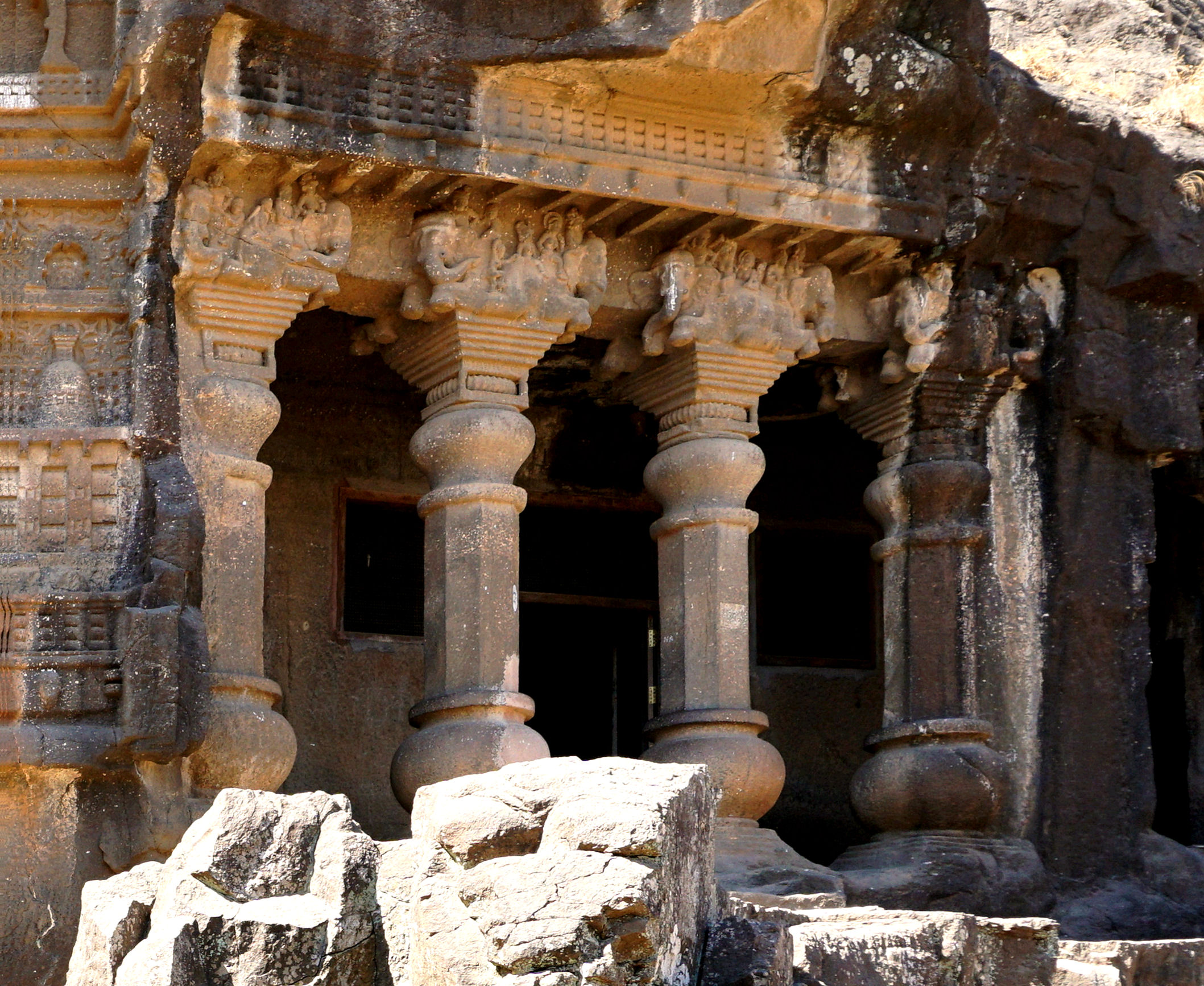
Exterior

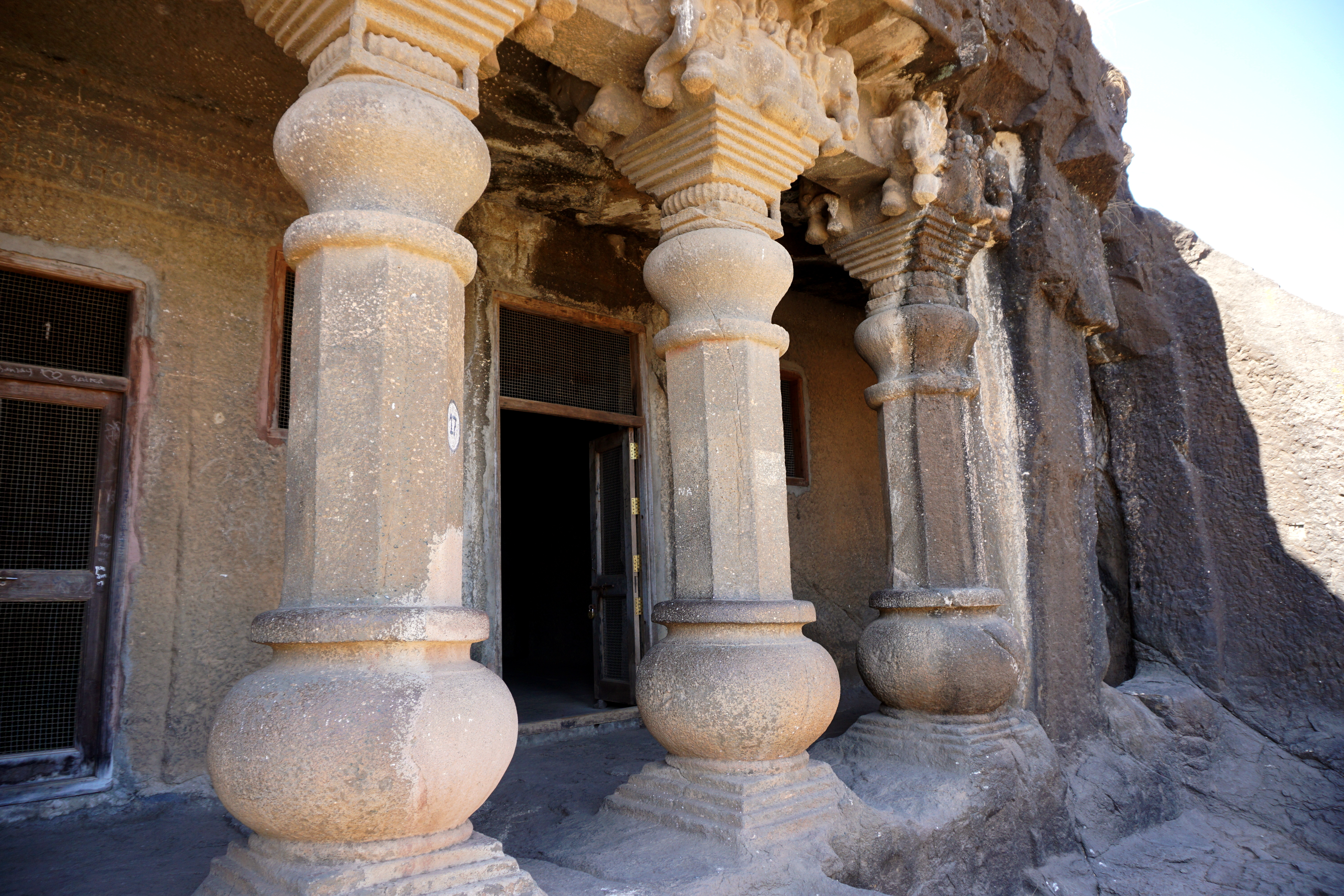
Entrance pillars

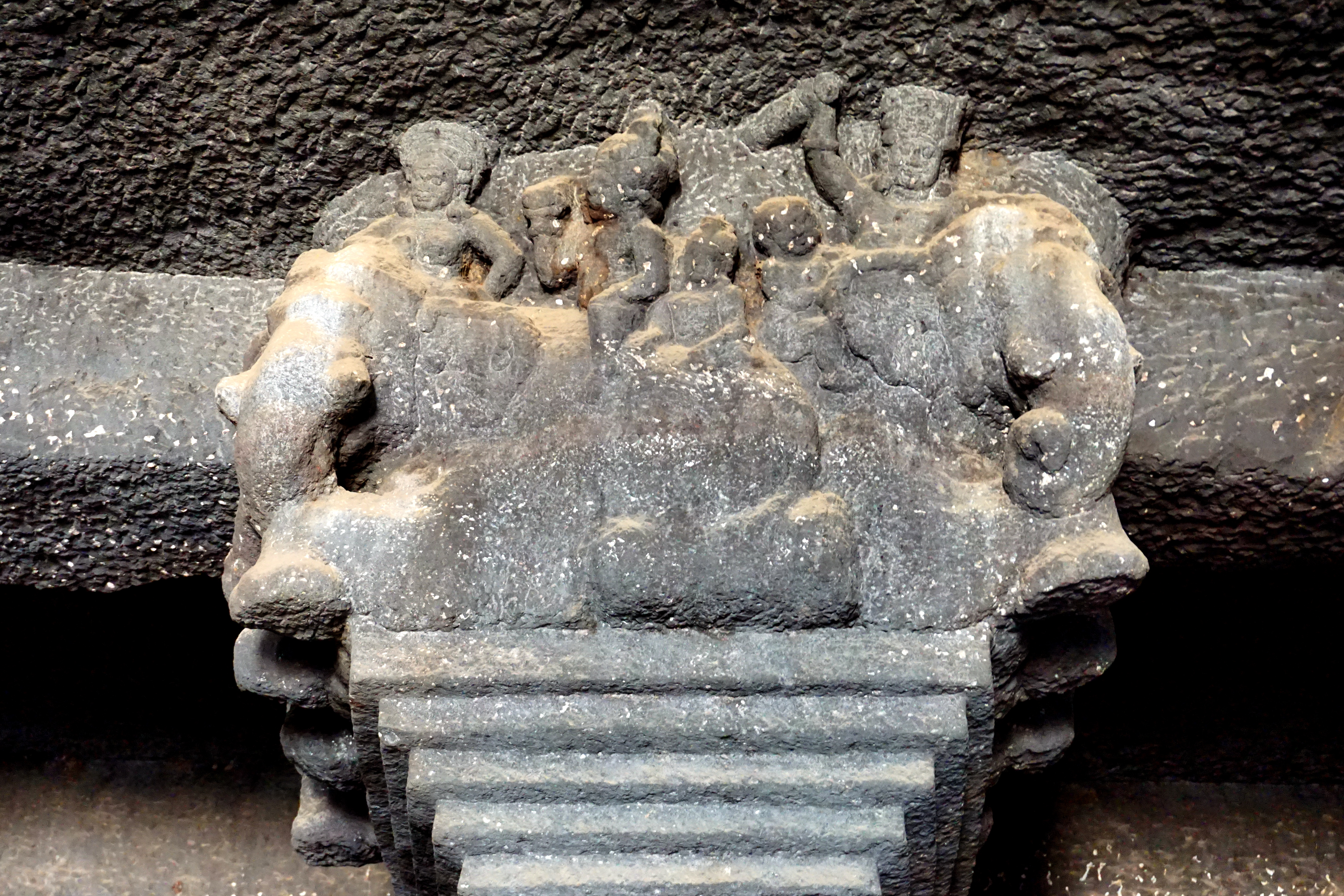
Pillar capital

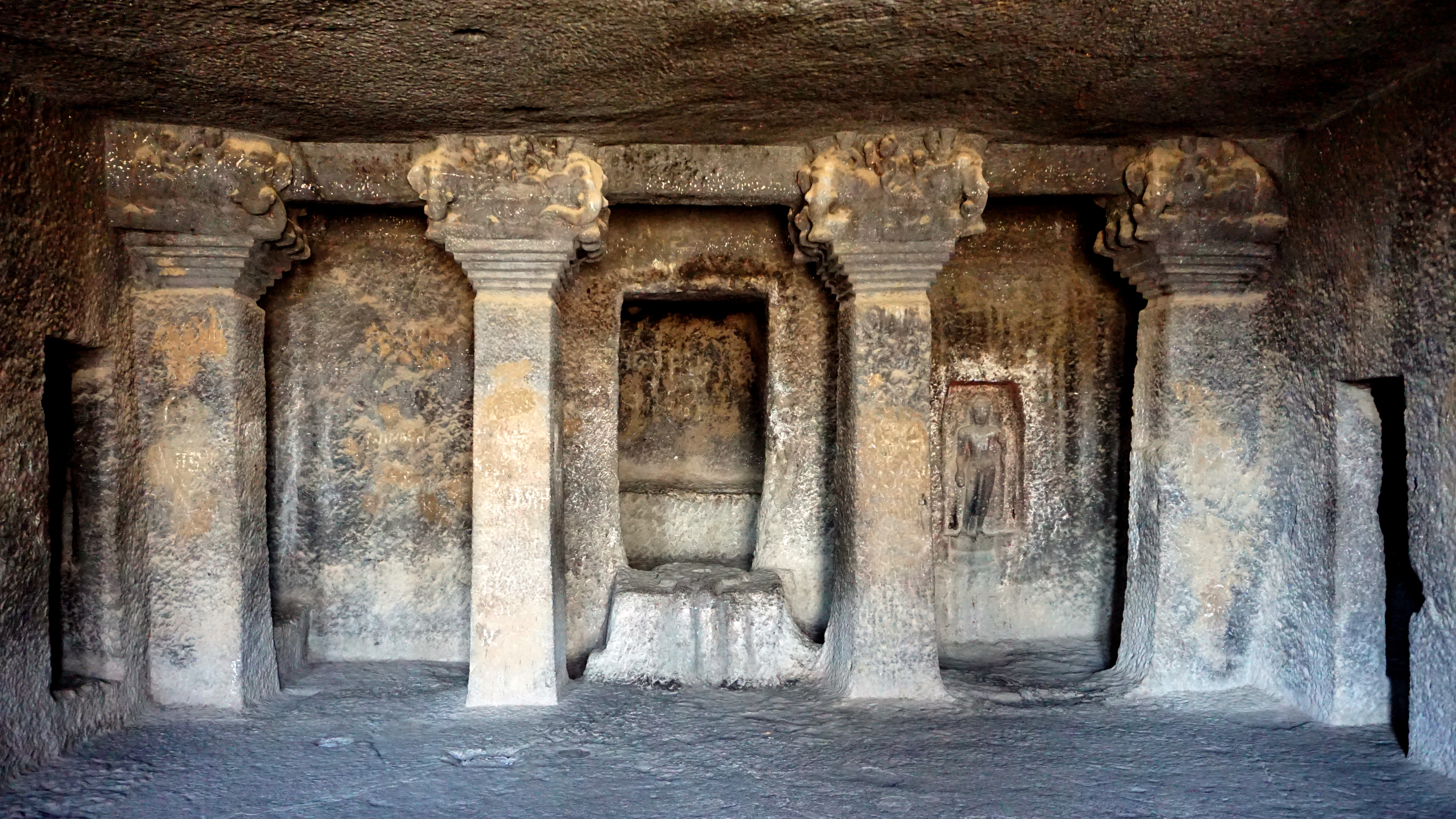
Interior

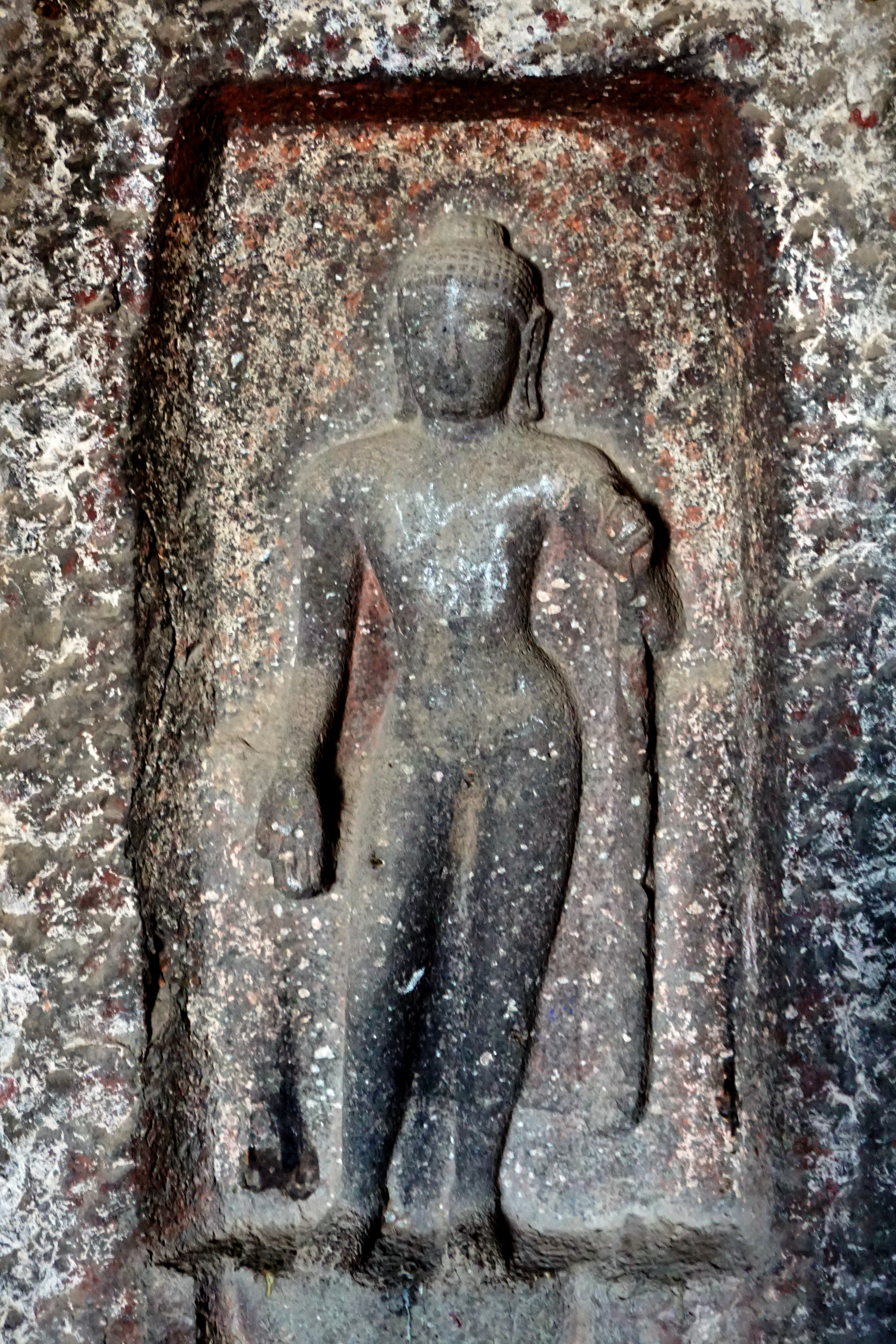
Standing Buddha

Manmodi Caves

In the Manmodi Caves, near Junnar, an inscription by a Yavana donor appears on the façade of the main Chaitya, on the central flat surface of the lotus over the entrance: it mentions the erection of the hall-front (façade) for the Buddhist Samgha, by a Yavana donor named Chanda:

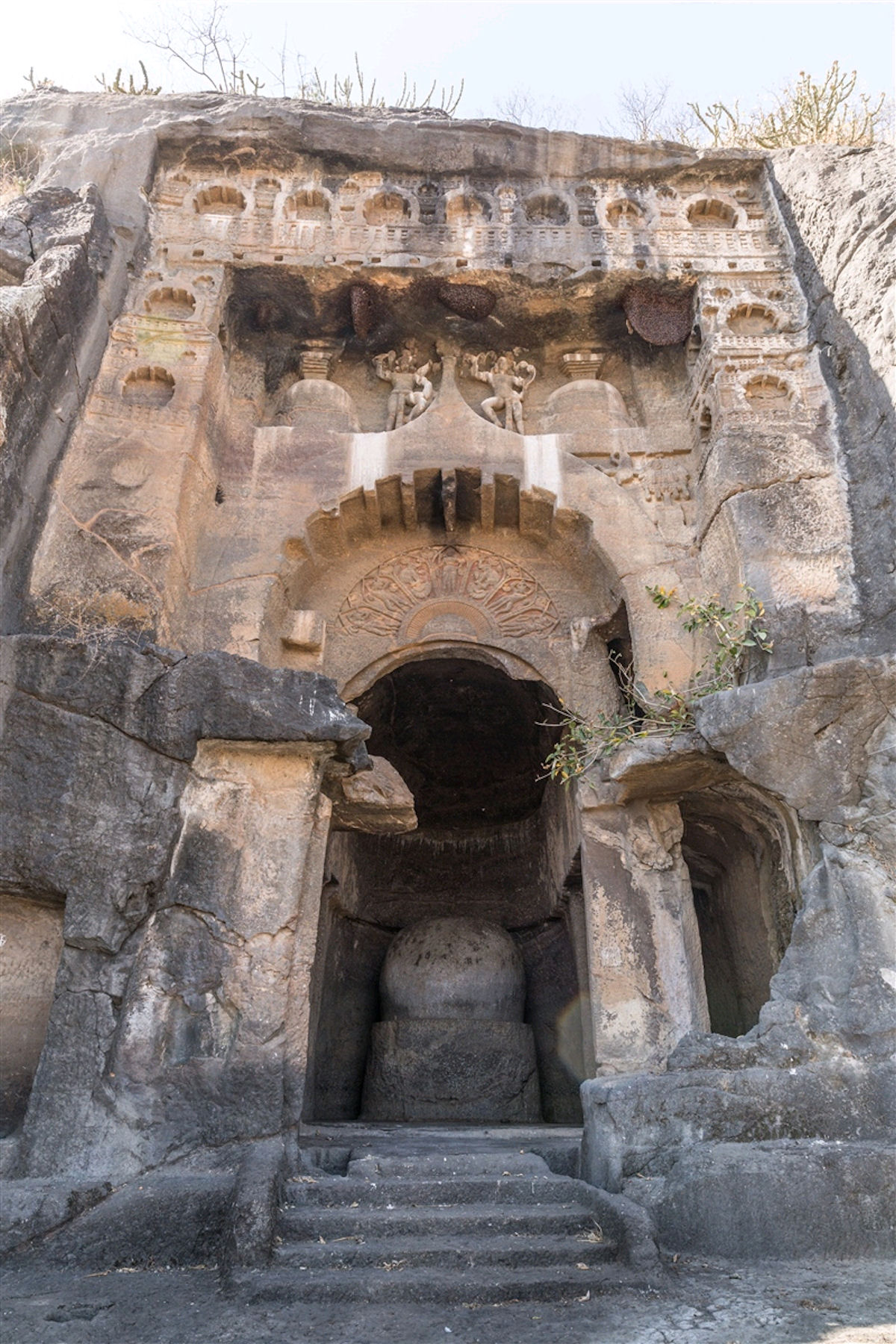
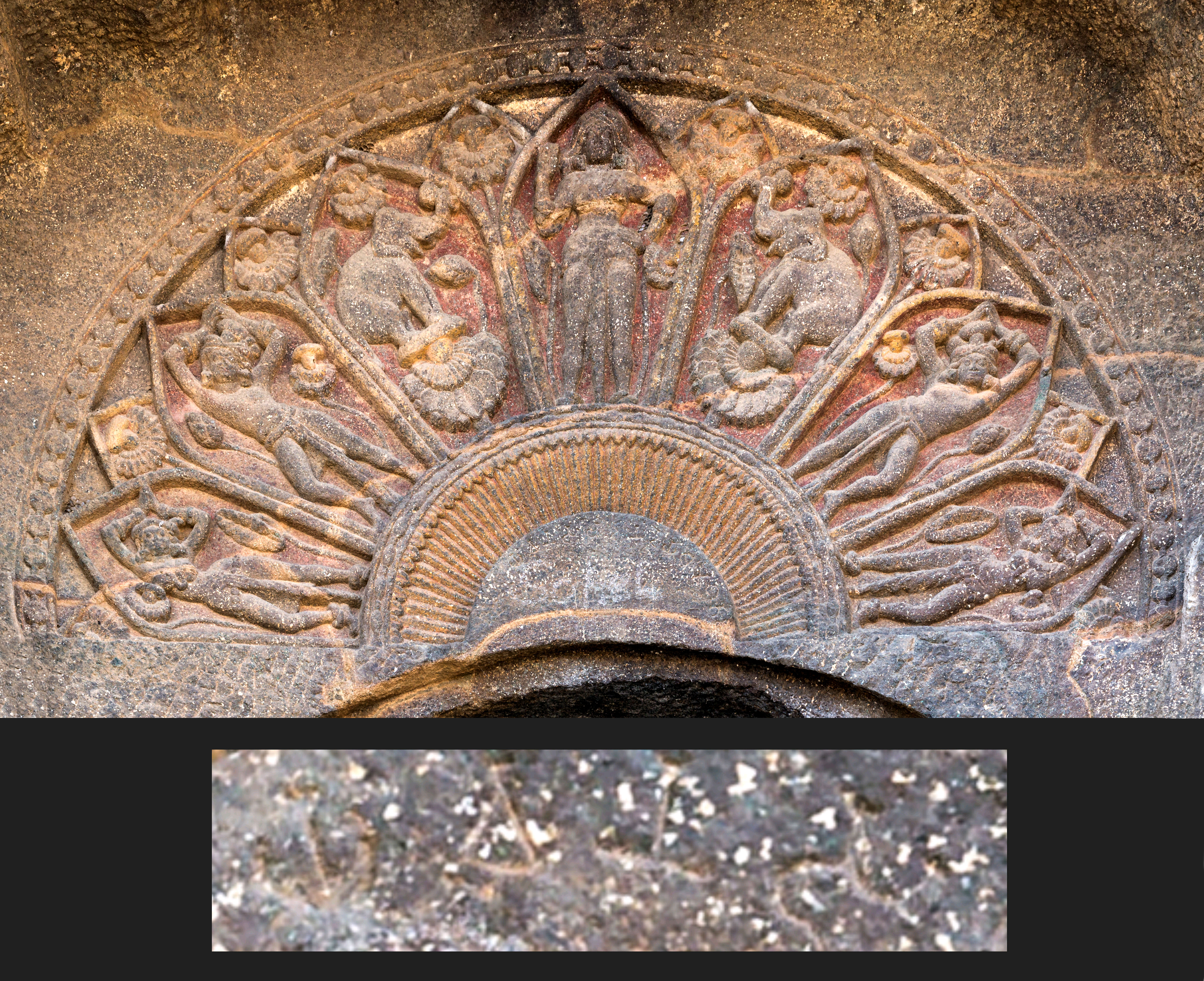
At the Manmodi Caves, the facade of the Chaitya (left) was donated by a Yavana, according to the inscription on the central flat surface of the lotus (right). Detail of the "Ya-va-na-sa" inscription in old Brahmi script:, c. AD 120.

"yavanasa camdānam gabhadā[ra]"
"The meritorious gift of the façade of the (gharba) hall by the Yavana Chanda"

— Inscription on the façade of the Manmodi Chaitya.

These contributions seem to have ended when the Satavahana King Gautamiputra Satakarni vanquished the Western Satrap ruler Nahapana, who had ruled over the area where these inscriptions were made, c. AD 130. This victory is known from the fact that Gautamiputra Satakarni restruck many of Nahapana's coins, and that he is claimed to have defeated a confederacy of Shakas (Western Kshatrapas), Pahlavas (Indo-Parthians), and Yavanas (Indo-Greeks), in the inscription of his mother Queen Gotami Balasiri at Cave No. 3 of the Nasik Caves:

...Siri-Satakani Gotamiputa (....) who crushed down the pride and conceit of the Kshatriyas; who destroyed the Sakas, Yavanas and Palhavas; who rooted out the Khakharata race; who restored the glory of the Satavahana family...

— Nasik Caves inscription of Queen Gotami Balasiri, circa AD 170, Cave No.3

Inscriptions of the 3rd century (AD 210–325) at the Nagarjunakonda Buddhist complex in southern India again mention the involvement of the Yavanas with Buddhism: an inscription in a monastery (Site No.38) describes its residents as Acaryas and Theriyas of the Vibhajyavada school, "who had gladdened the heart of the people of Kasmira, Gamdhara, Yavana, Vanavasa, and Tambapamnidipa".

==== Yavana era for Buddha sculptures ====
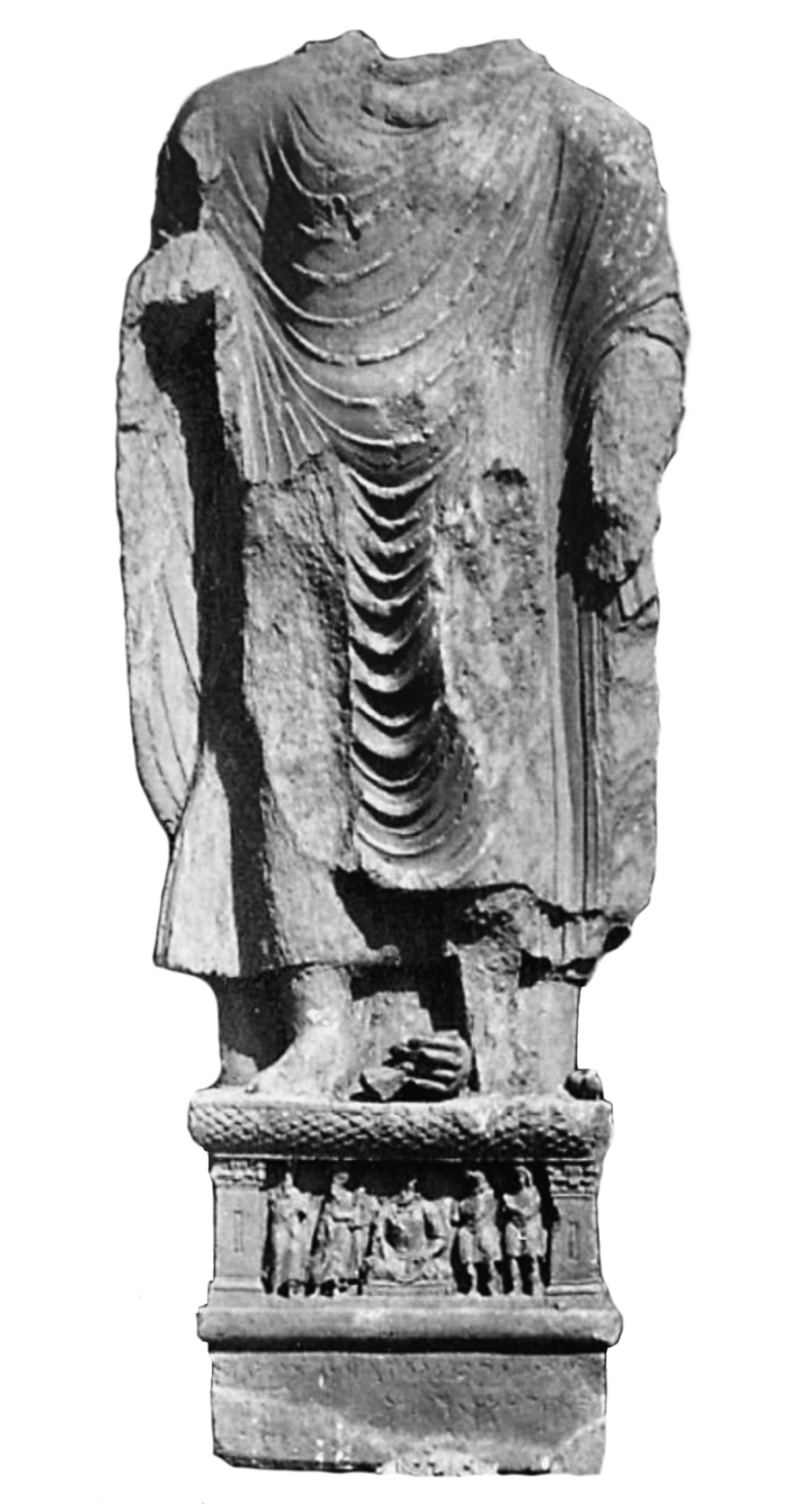
Statue with inscription mentioning "year 318", probably of the Yavana era, i.e. AD 143.

Several Gandhara Buddha statues with dated inscriptions, are now thought to have been dated in the Yavana era (originating c. 186 BC). One of the statues of the Buddha from Loriyan Tangai has an inscription mentioning "the year 318". The era in question is not specified, but it is now thought, following the discovery of the Bajaur reliquary inscription and a suggestion by Richard Salomon which has gained wide acceptance, that it is dated in the Yavana era beginning in 186 BC, and gives a date for the Buddha statue of c. AD 143.

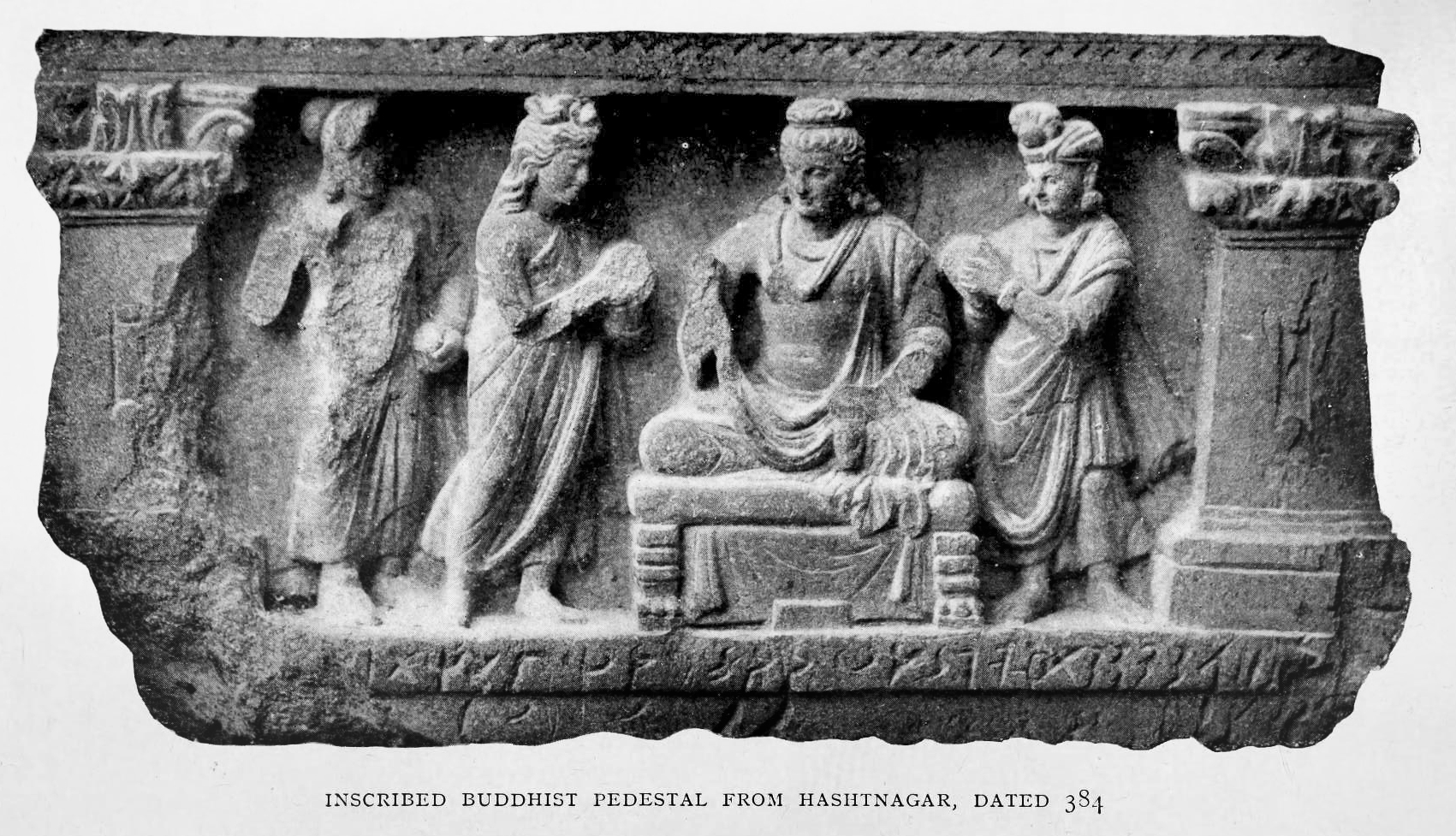
Piedestal of the Hashtnagar Buddha statue, with Year 384 inscription, probably of the Yavana era, i.e. AD 209.

The inscription at the base of the statue is:

sa 1 1 1 100 10 4 4 Prothavadasa di 20 4 1 1 1 Budhagosa danamu(khe) Saghorumasa sadaviyasa

"In year 318, the day 27 of Prausthapada, gift of Buddhaghosa, the companion of Samghavarma"

— Inscription of the Buddha of Loriyan Tangai.

This would make it one of the earliest known representations of the Buddha, after the Bimaran casket (1st century AD), and at about the same time as the Buddhist coins of Kanishka.

Another statue of Buddha, the Buddha of Hashtnagar, is inscribed from the year 384, also probably in the Yavana era, which is thought to be AD 209. Only the pedestal is preserved in the British Museum, the statue itself, with folds of clothing having more relief than those of the Loriyan Tangai Buddha, having disappeared.

== Ideology ==
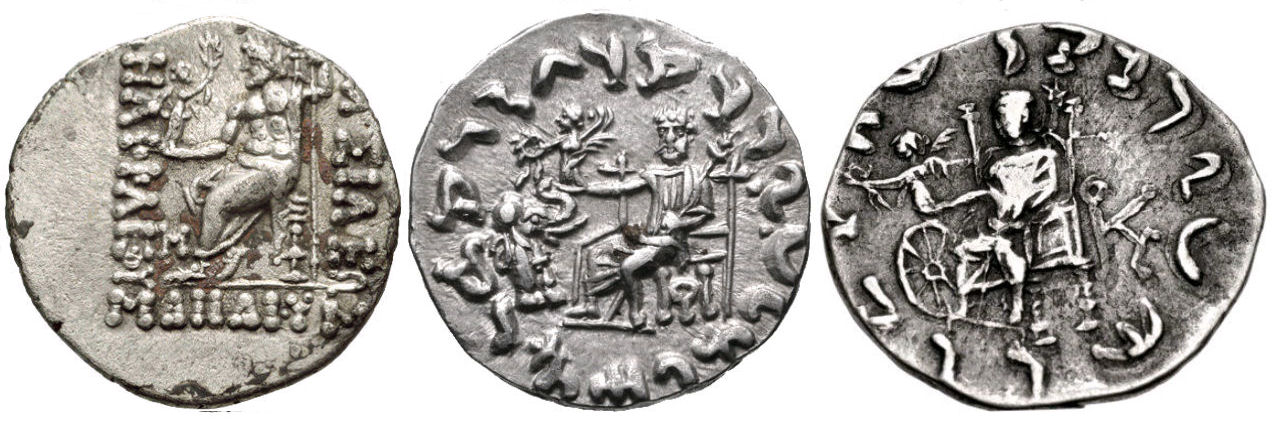
Evolution of Zeus Nikephoros ("Zeus holding Nike") on Indo-Greek coinage: from the Classical motif of Nike handing the wreath of victory to Zeus himself (left, coin of Heliocles I 145–130 BC), then to a baby elephant (middle, coin of Antialcidas 115–95 BC), and then to the Wheel of the Law, symbol of Buddhism (right, coin of Menander II 90–85 BC).

Buddhism flourished under the Indo-Greek kings, and their rule, especially that of Menander, has been remembered as benevolent. It has been suggested, although direct evidence is lacking, that their invasion of India was intended to show their support for the Mauryan empire with which they may have had a long history of marital alliances, (Note: Marital alliances: Discussion on the dynastic alliance in Tarn, pp. 152–153: "It has been recently suggested that Ashoka was grandson of the Seleucid princess, whom Seleucus gave in marriage to Chandragupta. Should this far-reaching suggestion be well founded, it would not only throw light on the good relations between the Seleucid and Maurya dynasties, but would mean that the Maurya dynasty was descended from, or anyhow connected with, Seleucus... when the Mauryan line became extinct, he (Demetrius) may well have regarded himself, if not as the next heir, at any rate as the heir nearest at hand". Also: "The Seleucid and Maurya lines were connected by the marriage of Seleucus' daughter (or niece) either to Chandragupta or his son Bindusara" John Marshall, Taxila, p20. This thesis originally appeared in "The Cambridge Shorter History of India": "If the usual oriental practice was followed and if we regard Chandragupta as the victor, then it would mean that a daughter or other female relative of Seleucus was given to the Indian ruler or to one of his sons, so that Ashoka may have had Greek blood in his veins." The Cambridge Shorter History of India, J. Allan, H. H. Dodwell, T. Wolseley Haig, p33.; Description of the 302 BC marital alliance in: "The Indians occupy in part some of the countries situated along the Indus, which formerly belonged to the Persians: Alexander deprived the Ariani of them, and established there settlements of his own. But Seleucus Nicator gave them to Sandrocottus in consequence of a marriage contract, and received in return five hundred elephants." The ambassador Megasthenes was also sent to the Mauryan court on this occasion.) exchange of presents, (Note: Exchange of presents: Classical sources have recorded that Chandragupta sent various aphrodisiacs to Seleucus: "And Theophrastus says that some contrivances are of wondrous efficacy in such matters as to make people more amorous. And Phylarchus confirms him, by reference to some of the presents which Sandrakottus, the king of the Indians, sent to Seleucus; which were to act like charms in producing a wonderful degree of affection, while some, on the contrary, were to banish love" Athenaeus of Naucratis, "The deipnosophists" Book I, chapter 32; Ashoka claims he introduced herbal medicine in the territories of the Greeks, for the welfare of humans and animals (Edict No2).; Bindusara asked Antiochus I to send him some sweet wine, dried figs and a sophist: "But dried figs were so very much sought after by all men (for really, as Aristophanes says, "There's really nothing nicer than dried figs"), that even Amitrochates, the king of the Indians, wrote to Antiochus, entreating him (it is Hegesander who tells this story) to buy and send him some sweet wine, and some dried figs, and a sophist; and that Antiochus wrote to him in answer, "The dry figs and the sweet wine we will send you; but it is not lawful for a sophist to be sold in Greece" Athenaeus, "Deipnosophistae" XIV.67) demonstrations of friendship, (Note: Treaties of friendship: When Antiochos III, after having made peace with Euthydemus, went to India in 209 BC, he is said to have renewed his friendship with the Indian king there and received presents from him: "He crossed the Caucasus (Hindu Kush) and descended into India; renewed his friendship with Sophagasenus the king of the Indians; received more elephants, until he had a hundred and fifty altogether; and having once more provisioned his troops, set out again personally with his army: leaving Androsthenes of Cyzicus the duty of taking home the treasure which this king had agreed to hand over to him.") exchange of ambassadors (Note: Ambassadors: Known ambassadors to India are Megasthenes, Deimakos and Dionysius.) and religious missions. (Note: Religious missions: In the Edicts of Ashoka, king Ashoka claims to have sent Buddhist emissaries to the Hellenistic west around 250 BC.) The historian Diodorus even wrote that the king of Pataliputra had "great love for the Greeks".

The Greek expansion into Indian territory may have been intended to protect Greek populations in India, and to protect the Buddhist faith from the religious persecutions of the Shungas. The city of Sirkap founded by Demetrius combines Greek and Indian influences without signs of segregation between the two cultures.

The first Greek coins to be minted in India, those of Menander I and Apollodotus I bear the mention "Saviour king" (ΒΑΣΙΛΕΩΣ ΣΩΤΗΡΟΣ), a title with high value in the Greek world which indicated an important deflective victory. For instance, Ptolemy I had been Soter (saviour) because he had helped save Rhodes from Demetrius the Besieger, and Antiochus I because he had saved Asia Minor from the Gauls. The title was also inscribed in Pali as ("Tratarasa") on the reverse of their coins. Menander and Apollodotus may indeed have been saviours to the Greek populations residing in India, and to some of the Indians as well.

Also, most of the coins of the Greek kings in India were bilingual, written in Greek on the front and in Pali on the back (in the Kharosthi script, derived from Aramaic, rather than the more eastern Brahmi, which was used only once on coins of Agathocles of Bactria), a tremendous concession to another culture never before made in the Hellenic world. From the reign of Apollodotus II, around 80 BC, Kharosthi letters started to be used as mintmarks on coins in combination with Greek monograms and mintmarks, suggesting the participation of local technicians to the minting process. Incidentally, these bilingual coins of the Indo-Greeks were the key in the decipherment of the Kharoshthi script by James Prinsep (1835) and Carl Ludwig Grotefend (1836). Kharoshthi became extinct around the 3rd century AD.

In Indian literature, the Indo-Greeks are described as Yavanas (in Sanskrit), or Yonas (in Pali) both thought to be transliterations of "Ionians". In the Harivamsa the "Yavana" Indo-Greeks are qualified, together with the Sakas, Kambojas, Pahlavas and Paradas as Kshatriya-pungava i.e. foremost among the Warrior caste, or Kshatriyas. The Majjhima Nikaya explains that in the lands of the Yavanas and Kambojas, in contrast with the numerous Indian castes, there were only two classes of people, Aryas and Dasas (masters and slaves).

== Religion ==
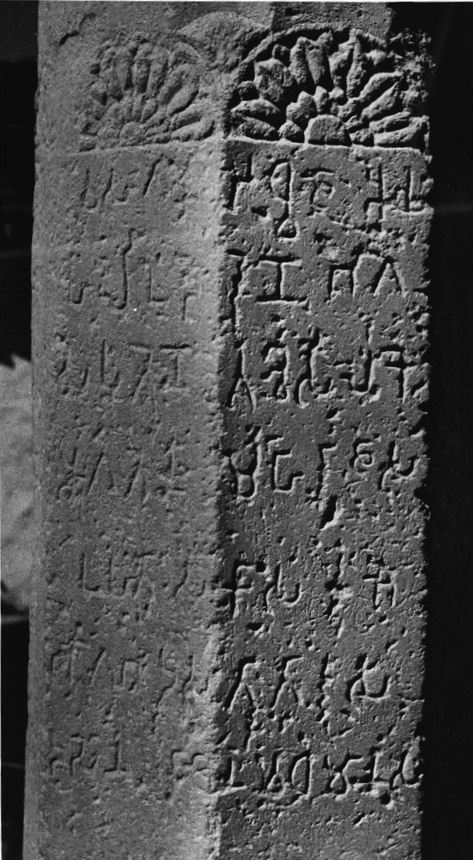
The Heliodorus pillar, commissioned by Indo-Greek ambassador Heliodorus.

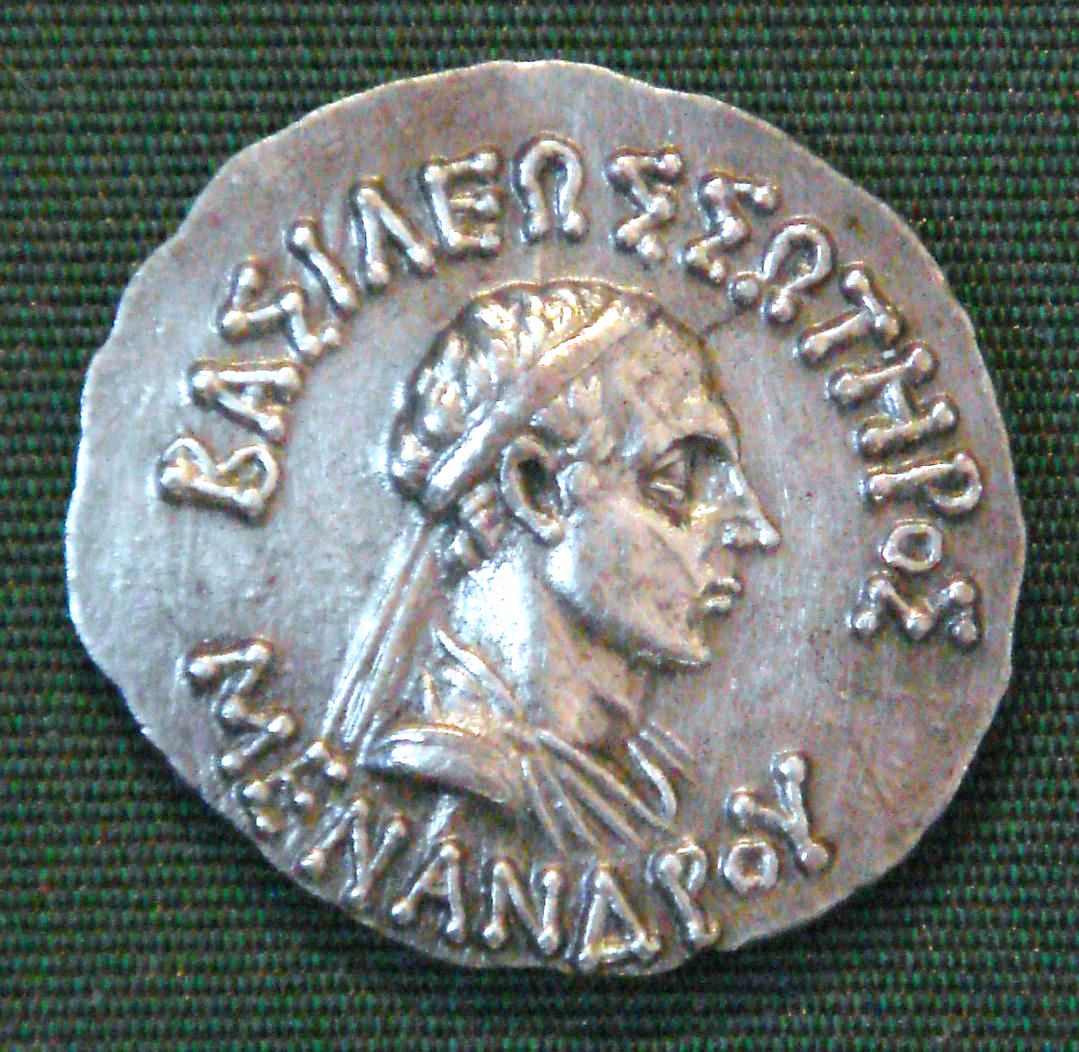
Menander I converted to Buddhism, as described in the Milinda Panha. After his conversion, he became noted for being a leading patron of Buddhism.

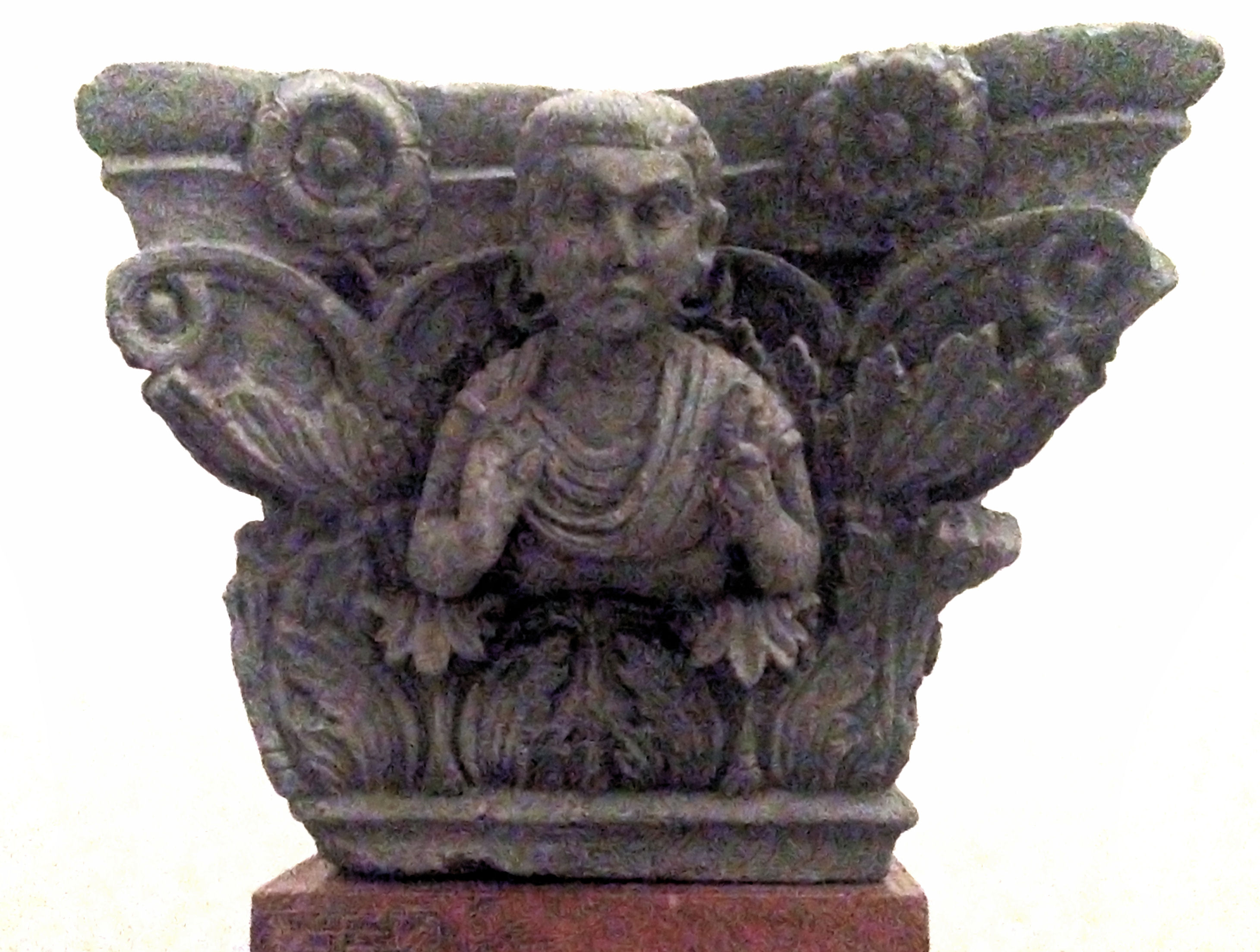
Indo-Corinthian capital representing a man wearing a Graeco-Roman-style coat with fibula, and making a blessing gesture. Butkara Stupa, National Museum of Oriental Art, Rome.

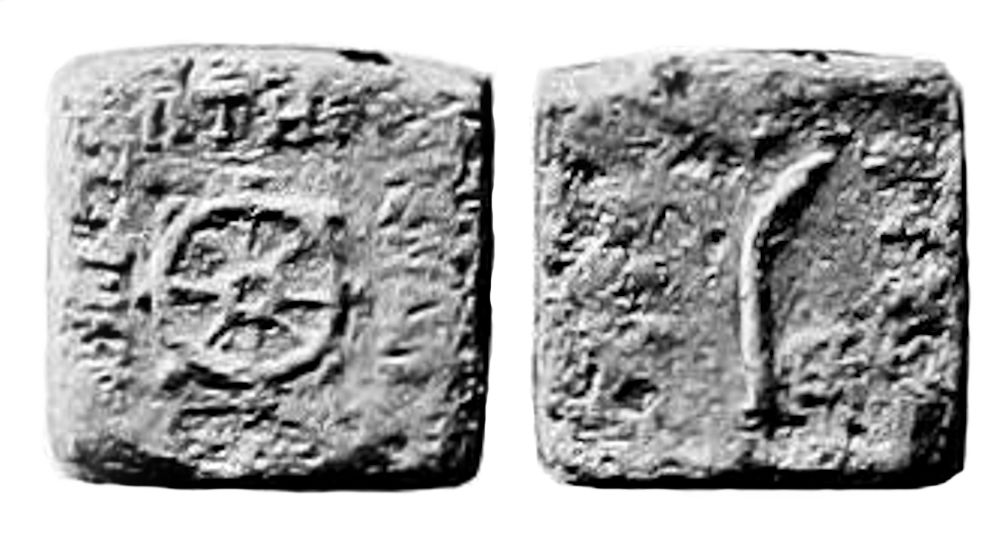
Indian-standard coinage of Menander I. Obv ΒΑΣΙΛΕΩΣ ΣΩΤΗΡΟΣ ΜΕΝΑΝΔΡΟΥ "Of Saviour King Menander". Rev Palm of victory, Kharoshthi legend Māhārajasa trātadasa Menandrāsa, British Museum.

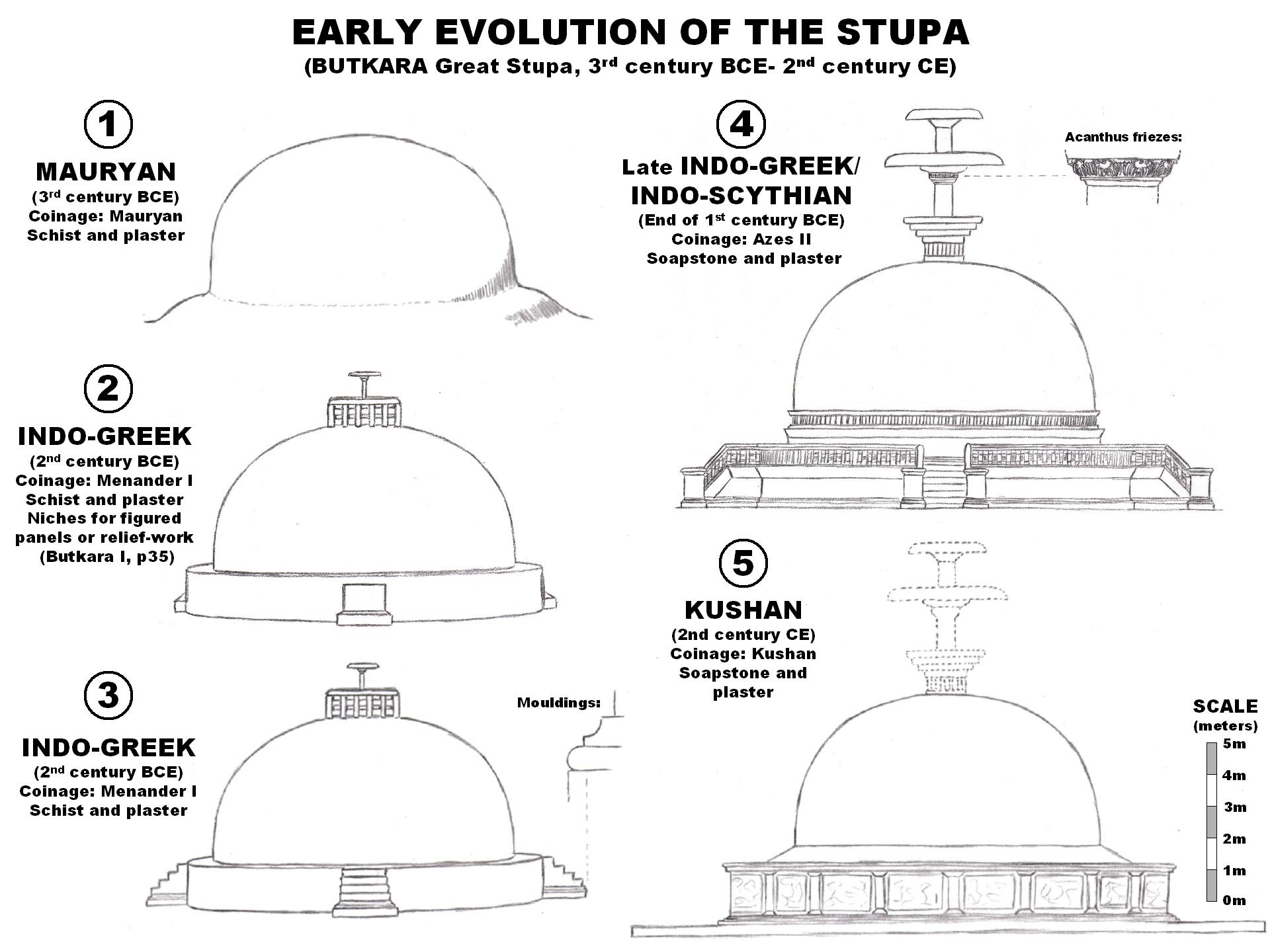
Evolution of the Butkara stupa, a large part of which occurred during the Indo-Greek period, through the addition of Hellenistic architectural elements.

In addition to the worship of the Classical pantheon of the Greek deities found on their coins (Zeus, Herakles, Athena, Apollo...), the Indo-Greeks were involved with local faiths, particularly with Buddhism, but also with Hinduism and Zoroastrianism.

=== Interactions with Buddhism ===
Chandragupta Maurya, the founder of the Mauryan Empire, conquered the Greek satraps left by Alexander, which belonged to Seleucus I Nicator of the Seleucid Empire. The Mauryan Emperor Ashoka would then establish the largest empire in the Indian Subcontinent through an aggressive expansion. Ashoka converted to Buddhism following the destructive Kalinga War, abandoning further conquests in favor of humanitarian reforms. Ashoka erected the Edicts of Ashoka to spread Buddhism and the 'Law of Piety' throughout his dominion. In one of his edicts, Ashoka claims to have converted his Greek population along with others to Buddhism.

Here in the king's domain among the Greeks, the Kambojas, the Nabhakas, the Nabhapamkits, the Bhojas, the Pitinikas, the Andhras and the Palidas, everywhere people are following Beloved-of-the-Gods' instructions in Dharma.

The last Mauryan Emperor Brihadratha was assassinated by Pushyamitra Shunga, the former senapati or "army lord" of the Mauryan Empire and founder of the Shunga Empire. Pushyamitra is alleged to have persecuted Buddhism in favor of Hinduism, likely in attempt to further remove the legacy of the Mauryan Empire.

... Pushyamitra equipped a fourfold army, and intending to destroy the Buddhist religion, he went to the Kukkutarama (in Pataliputra). ... Pushyamitra therefore destroyed the sangharama, killed the monks there, and departed. ... After some time, he arrived in Sakala, and proclaimed that he would give a ... reward to whoever brought him the head of a Buddhist monk.

It is possible that Menander I Soter or the "Saviour king", choose Sakala as his capital due to the Buddhist presence there. Menander I, is stated to have converted to Buddhism in the Milinda Panha, which records the dialogue between Menander and the Buddhist monk Nagasena. Menander is claimed to have obtained the title of an arhat.

And afterwards, taking delight in the wisdom of the Elder, he (Menander) handed over his kingdom to his son, and abandoning the household life for the house-less state, grew great in insight, and himself attained to Arahatship!

— The Questions of King Milinda, Translation by T. W. Rhys Davids.

The wheel he represented on some of his coins was most likely Buddhist Dharmachakra,.

Another Indian text, the Stupavadana of Ksemendra, mentions in the form of a prophecy that Menander will build a stupa in Pataliputra.

Plutarch also presents Menander as an example of benevolent rule, and explains that upon his death, the honour of sharing his remains was claimed by the various cities under his rule, and they were enshrined in "monuments" (μνημεία, probably stupas), in a parallel with the historic Buddha:

But when one Menander, who had reigned graciously over the Bactrians, died afterwards in the camp, the cities indeed by common consent celebrated his funerals; but coming to a contest about his relics, they were difficultly at last brought to this agreement, that his ashes being distributed, everyone should carry away an equal share, and they should all erect monuments to him.

— Plutarch, "Political Precepts" Praec. reip. ger. 28, 6).

The Butkara stupa was "monumentalized" by the addition of Hellenistic architectural decorations during Indo-Greek rule in the 2nd century BC. A coin of Menander I was found in the second oldest stratum (GSt 2) of the Butkara stupa suggesting a period of additional constructions during the reign of Menander. It is thought that Menander was the builder of the second oldest layer of the Butkara stupa, following its initial construction during the Mauryan Empire.

=== "Followers of the Dharma" ===
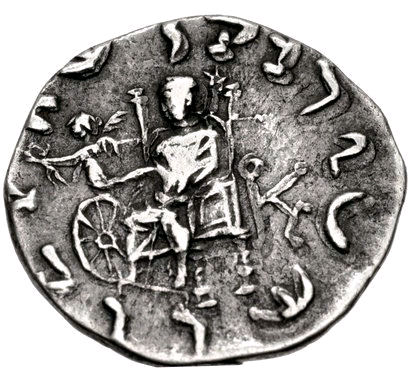
Coin of Menander II (90–85 BC). "King Menander, follower of the Dharma" in Kharoshthi script, with Zeus holding Nike, who holds a victory wreath over an Eight-spoked wheel.

Several Indo-Greek kings use the title "Dharmikasa", i.e. "Follower of the Dharma", in the Kharoshti script on the obverse of their coins. The corresponding legend in Greek is "Dikaios" ("The Just"), a rather usual attribute on Greek coins. The expression "Follower of the Dharma" would of course resonate strongly with Indian subjects, used to this expression being employed by pious kings, especially since the time of Ashoka who advocated the Dharma in his inscriptions. The seven kings using "Dharmakasa", i.e. "Follower of the Dharma", are late Indo-Greek kings, from around 150 BC, right after the reign of Menander I, and mainly associated with the area of Gandhara: Zoilos I (130–120 BC), Strato (130–110 BC), Heliokles II (95–80 BC), Theophilos (130 or 90 BC), Menander II (90–85 BC), Archebios (90–80 BC) and Peukolaos (c. 90 BC). The attribute of Dharmika was again used a century later by a known Buddhist practitioner, Indo-Scythian king Kharahostes, to extoll on his coins the virtues of his predecessor king Azes.

=== Blessing gestures ===
From the time of Agathokleia and Strato I, circa 100 BC, kings and divinities are regularly show on coins making blessing gestures, which often seem similar to the Buddhist Vitarka mudra. As centuries passed, the exact shapes taken by the hand becomes less clear. This blessing gesture was also often adopted by the Indo-Scythians.

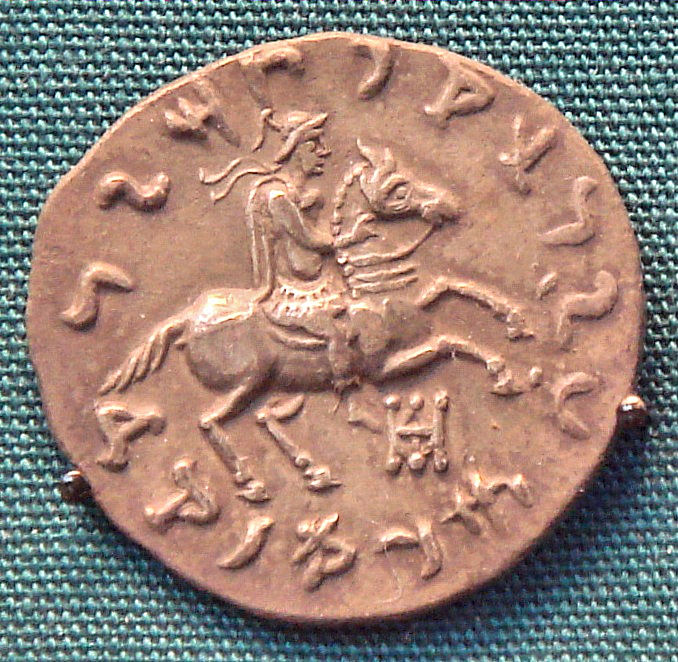
King Philoxenus (c. 100 BC), riding a horse and making a blessing gesture.

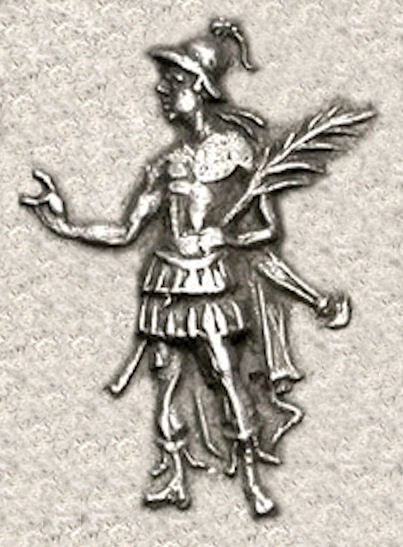
King Nicias in Hellenistic uniform, holding a palm of victory, and making a blessing gesture.

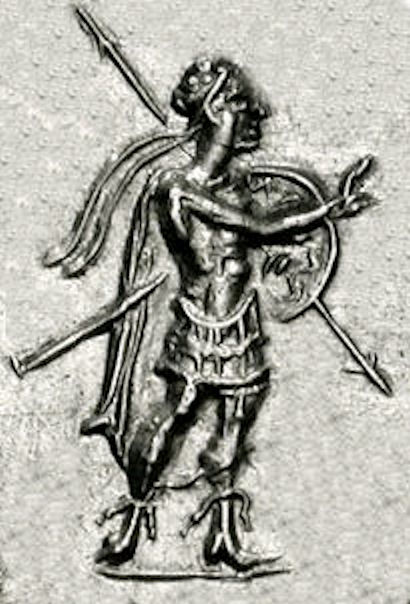
King Strato I in combat gear, making a blessing gesture with his right hand, circa 100 BC.

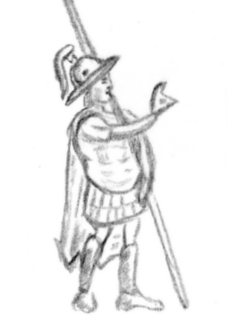
King Menander II in military uniform, holding a spear and making a blessing gesture with his right hand.

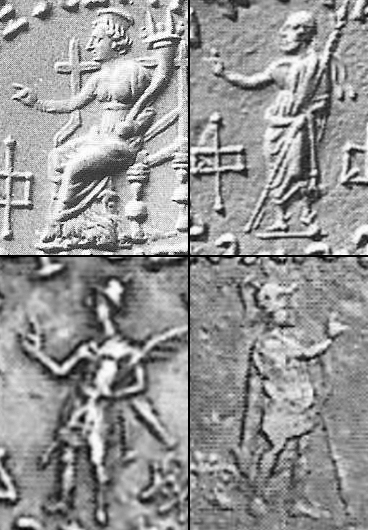
Various blessing gestures: divinities (top), kings (bottom).

=== Vaishnavites ===
The Heliodorus pillar is a stone column that was erected around 113 BC in central India in Vidisha near modern Besnagar, by Heliodorus, a Greek ambassador of the Indo-Greek king Antialcidas to the court of the Shunga king Bhagabhadra. The pillar originally supported a statue of Garuda. In the dedication, the Indo-Greek ambassador explains he is a devotee of "Vāsudeva, the God of Gods". Historically, it is the first known inscription related to the Bhagavata group in India.

== Art ==
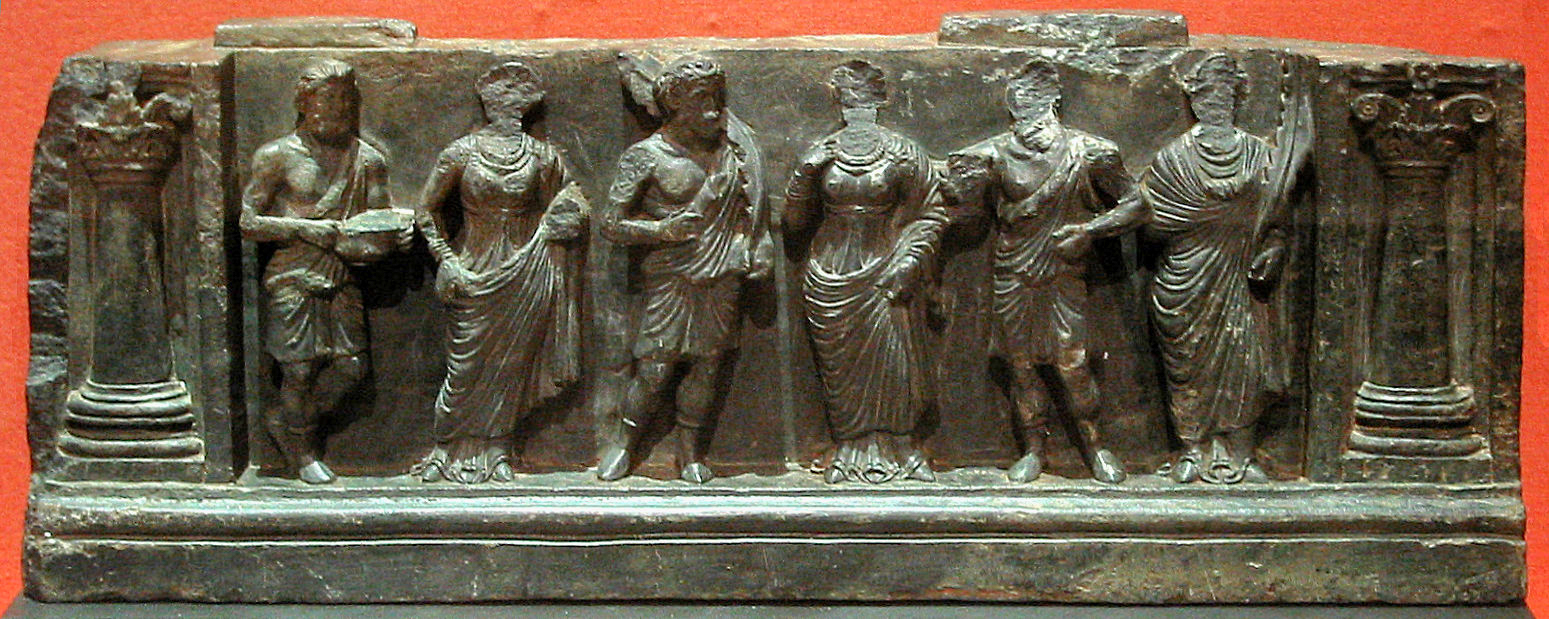
Greek Buddhist devotees, holding plantain leaves, in purely Hellenistic style, inside Corinthian columns, Buner relief, Victoria and Albert Museum.

In general, the art of the Indo-Greeks is poorly documented, and few works of art (apart from their coins and a few stone palettes) are directly attributed to them. The coinage of the Indo-Greeks however is generally considered some of the most artistically brilliant of Antiquity. The Hellenistic heritage (Ai-Khanoum) and artistic proficiency of the Indo-Greek world would suggest a rich sculptural tradition as well, but traditionally very few sculptural remains have been attributed to them. On the contrary, most Gandharan Hellenistic works of art are usually attributed to the direct successors of the Indo-Greeks in India in the 1st century AD, such as the nomadic Indo-Scythians, the Indo-Parthians and, in an already decadent state, the Kushans In general, Gandharan sculpture cannot be dated exactly, leaving the exact chronology open to interpretation.

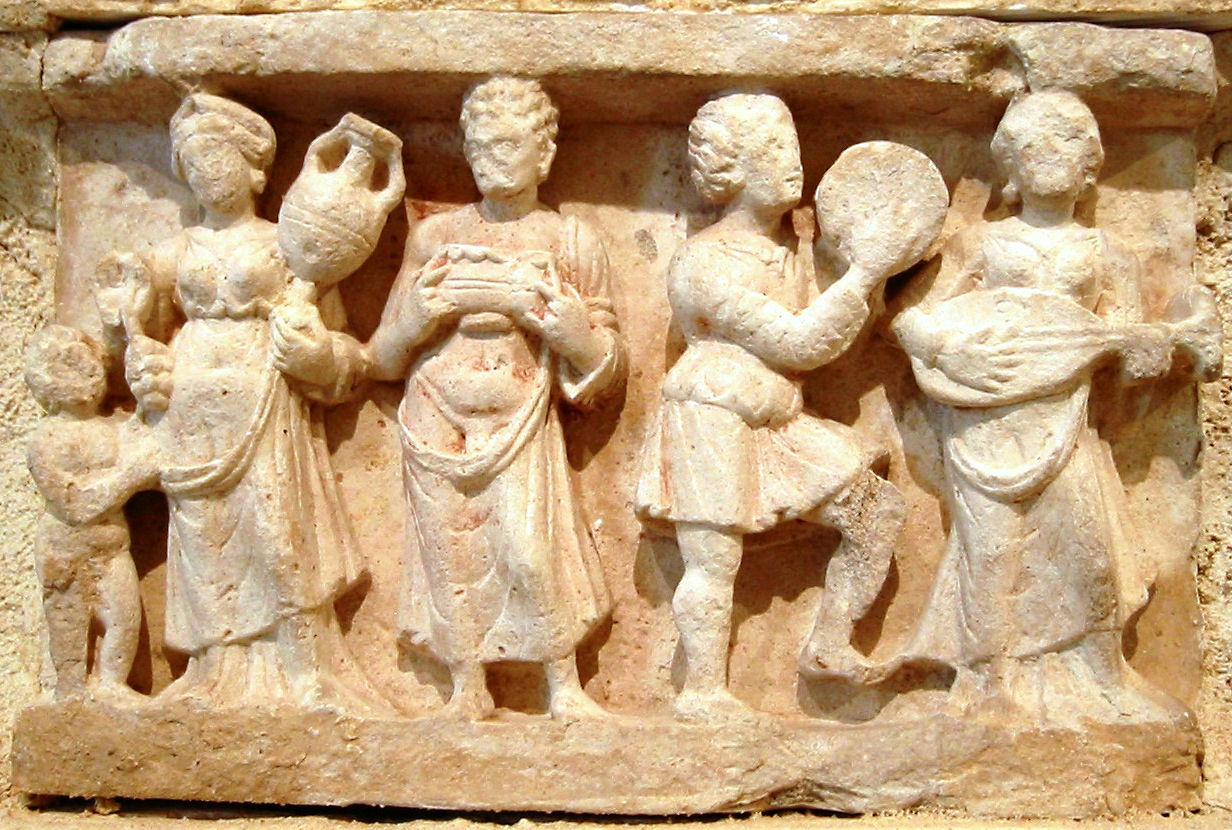
Hellenistic culture in the Indian subcontinent: Greek clothes, amphoras, wine and music (Detail of Chakhil-i-Ghoundi stupa, Hadda, Gandhara, 1st century AD).

The possibility of a direct connection between the Indo-Greeks and Greco-Buddhist art has been reaffirmed recently as the dating of the rule of Indo-Greek kings has been extended to the first decades of the 1st century AD, with the reign of Strato II in the Punjab. Also, Foucher, Tarn, and more recently, Boardman, Bussagli and McEvilley have taken the view that some of the most purely Hellenistic works of northwestern India and Afghanistan, may actually be wrongly attributed to later centuries, and instead belong to a period one or two centuries earlier, to the time of the Indo-Greeks in the 2nd–1st century BC: (Note: On the Indo-Greeks and the Gandhara school: 1) "It is necessary to considerably push back the start of Gandharan art, to the first half of the first century BC, or even, very probably, to the preceding century.(...) The origins of Gandharan art... go back to the Greek presence. (...) Gandharan iconography was already fully formed before, or at least at the very beginning of our era" Mario Bussagli "L'art du Gandhara", p331–332; 2) "The beginnings of the Gandhara school have been dated everywhere from the first century B.C. (which was M.Foucher's view) to the Kushan period and even after it" (Tarn, p. 394). Foucher's views can be found in "La vieille route de l'Inde, de Bactres a Taxila", pp340–341). The view is also supported by Sir John Marshall ("The Buddhist art of Gandhara", pp5–6).; 3) Also the recent discoveries at Ai-Khanoum confirm that "Gandharan art descended directly from Hellenized Bactrian art" (Chaibi Nustamandy, "Crossroads of Asia", 1992).; 4) On the Indo-Greeks and Greco-Buddhist art: "It was about this time (100 BC) that something took place which is without parallel in Hellenistic history: Greeks of themselves placed their artistic skill at the service of a foreign religion, and created for it a new form of expression in art" (Tarn, p. 393). "We have to look for the beginnings of Gandharan Buddhist art in the residual Indo-Greek tradition, and in the early Buddhist stone sculpture to the South (Bharhut etc...)" (Boardman, 1993, p. 124). "Depending on how the dates are worked out, the spread of Gandhari Buddhism to the north may have been stimulated by Menander's royal patronage, as may the development and spread of the Gandharan sculpture, which seems to have accompanied it" McEvilley, 2002, "The shape of ancient thought", p. 378.)

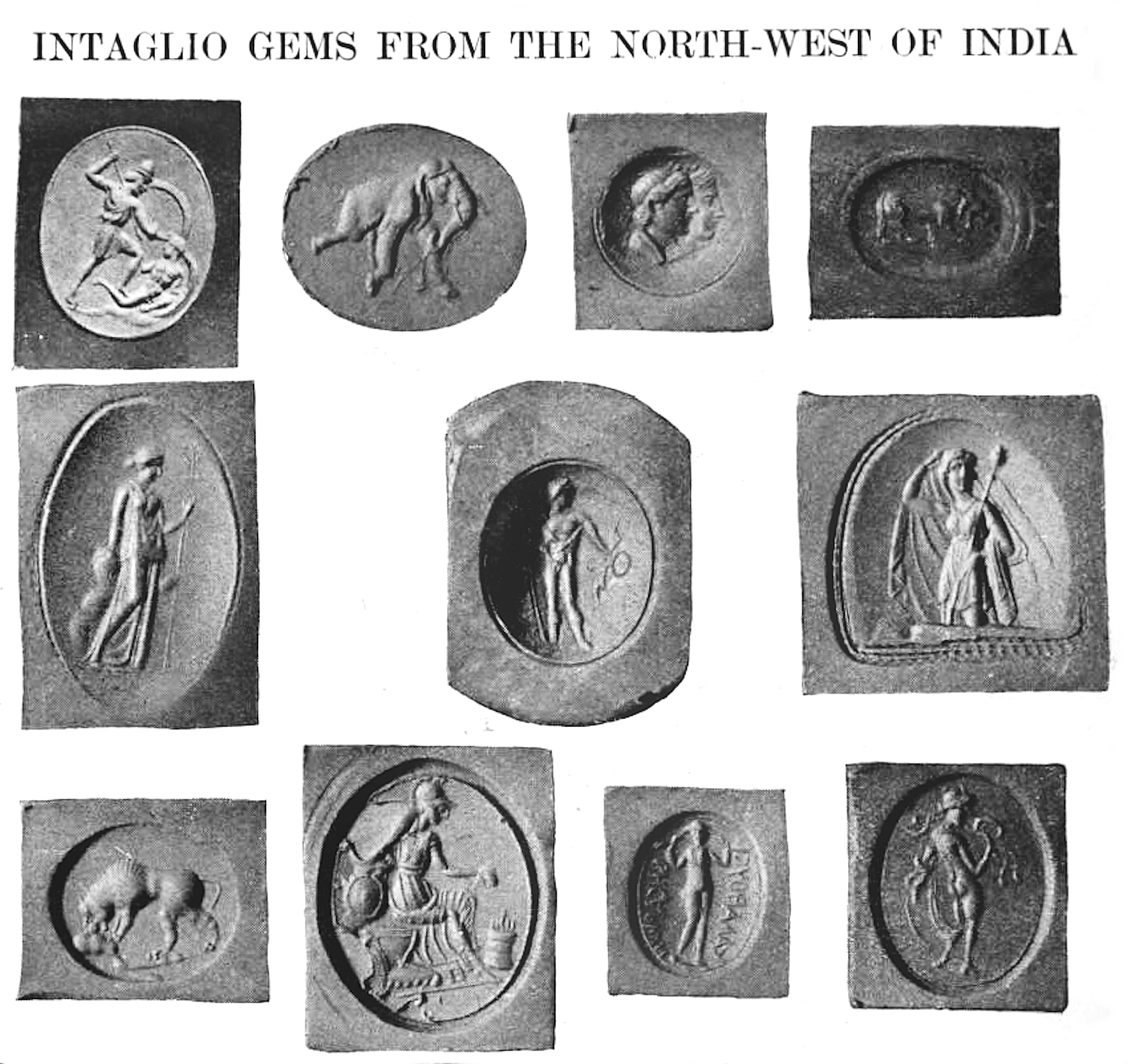
Intaglio gems engraved in the northwest of India (2nd century BCE-2nd century CE).

This is particularly the case of some purely Hellenistic works in Hadda, Afghanistan, an area which "might indeed be the cradle of incipient Buddhist sculpture in Indo-Greek style". Referring to one of the Buddha triads in Hadda, in which the Buddha is sided by very Classical depictions of Herakles/Vajrapani and Tyche/Hariti, Boardman explains that both figures "might at first (and even second) glance, pass as, say, from Asia Minor or Syria of the first or second century BC (...) these are essentially Greek figures, executed by artists fully conversant with far more than the externals of the Classical style".

Alternatively, it has been suggested that these works of art may have been executed by itinerant Greek artists during the time of maritime contacts with the West from the 1st to the 3rd century AD.

The Greco-Buddhist art of Gandhara, beyond the omnipresence of Greek style and stylistic elements which might be simply considered an enduring artistic tradition, offers numerous depictions of people in Greek Classical realistic style, attitudes and fashion (clothes such as the chiton and the himation, similar in form and style to the 2nd century BC Greco-Bactrian statues of Ai-Khanoum, hairstyle), holding contraptions which are characteristic of Greek culture (amphoras, "kantaros" Greek drinking cups), in situations which can range from festive (such as Bacchanalian scenes) to Buddhist-devotional.

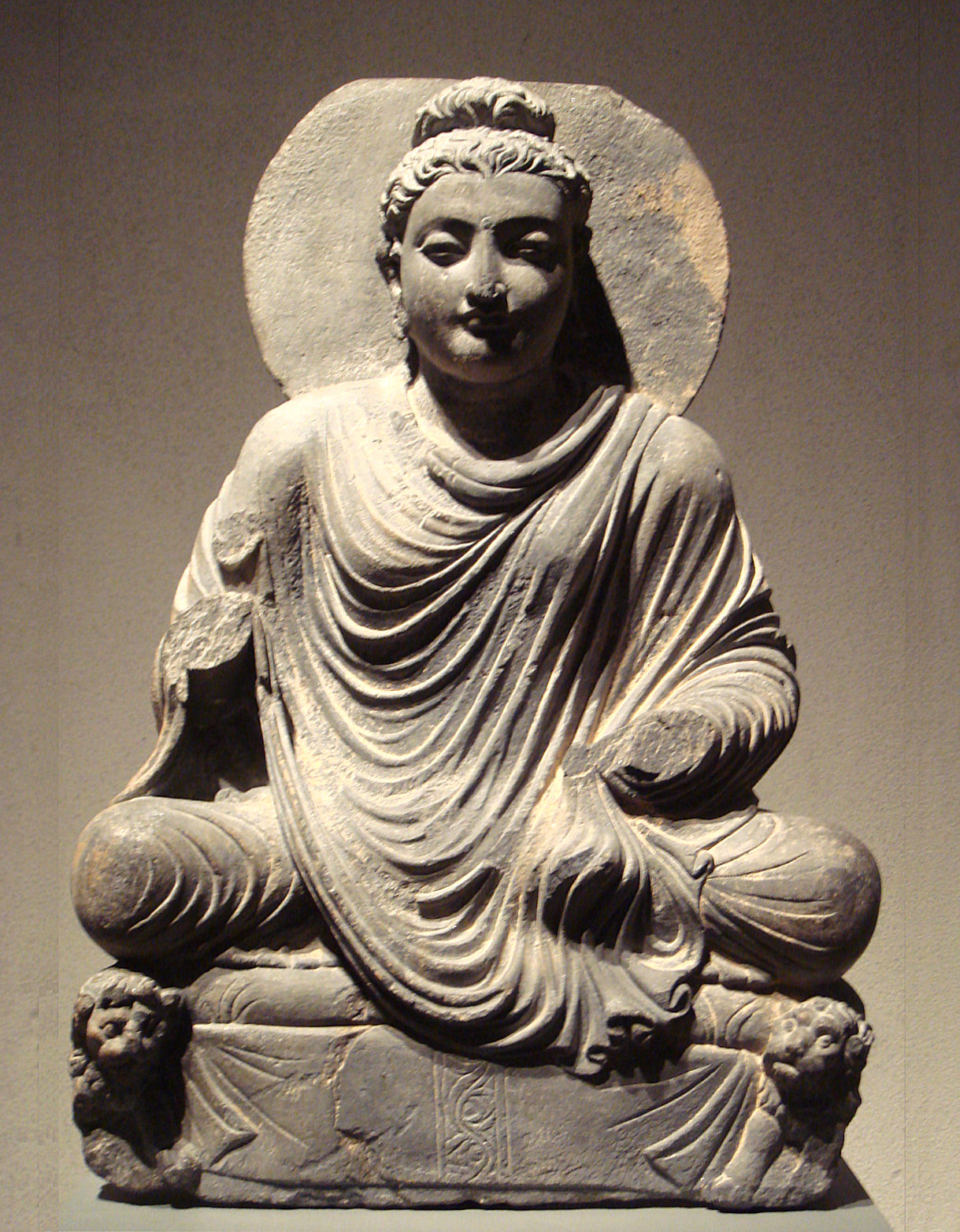
Seated Buddha, Gandhara, 2nd century (Ostasiatisches Museum, Berlin)

Uncertainties in dating make it unclear whether these works of art actually depict Greeks of the period of Indo-Greek rule up to the 1st century BC, or remaining Greek communities under the rule of the Indo-Parthians or Kushans in the 1st and 2nd century AD. Benjamin Rowland thinks that the Indo-Greeks, rather than the Indo-Scythians or the Kushans, may have been the models for the Bodhisattva statues of Gandhara

== Economy ==
Very little is known about the economy of the Indo-Greeks, although it seems to have been rather vibrant.

=== Coinage ===
The abundance of their coins would tend to suggest large mining operations, particularly in the mountainous area of the Hindu-Kush, and an important monetary economy. The Indo-Greek did strike bilingual coins both in the Greek "round" standard and in the Indian "square" standard, suggesting that monetary circulation extended to all parts of society. The adoption of Indo-Greek monetary conventions by neighbouring kingdoms, such as the Kunindas to the east and the Satavahanas to the south, would also suggest that Indo-Greek coins were used extensively for cross-border trade.

=== Tribute payments ===
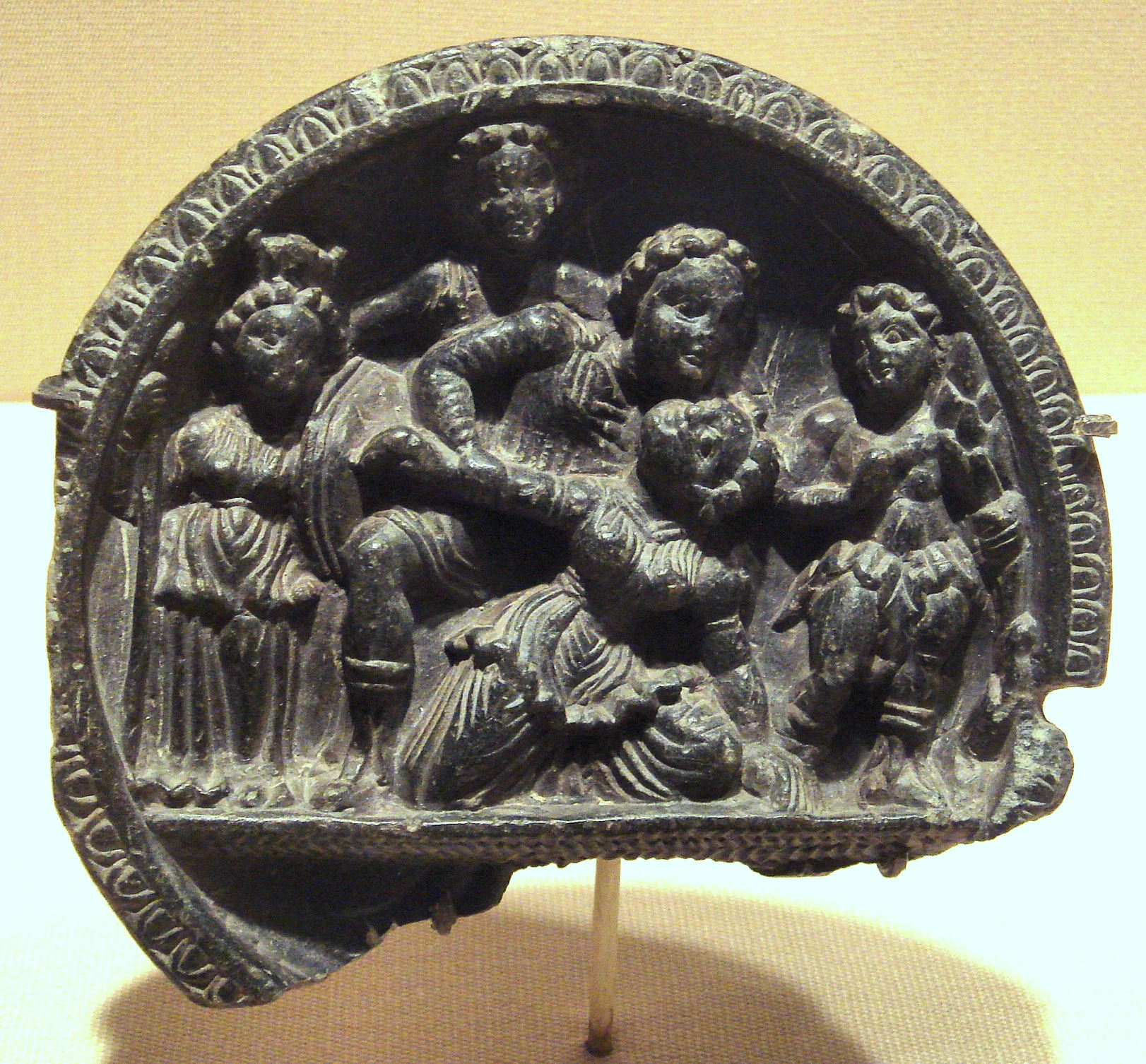
Stone palette depicting a mythological scene, 2nd–1st century BC.

It would also seem that some of the coins emitted by the Indo-Greek kings, particularly those in the monolingual Attic standard, may have been used to pay some form of tribute to the Yuezhi tribes north of the Hindu-Kush. This is indicated by the coins finds of the Qunduz hoard in northern Afghanistan, which have yielded quantities of Indo-Greek coins in the Hellenistic standard (Greek weights, Greek language), although none of the kings represented in the hoard are known to have ruled so far north. Conversely, none of these coins have ever been found south of the Hindu-Kush.

=== Trade with China ===
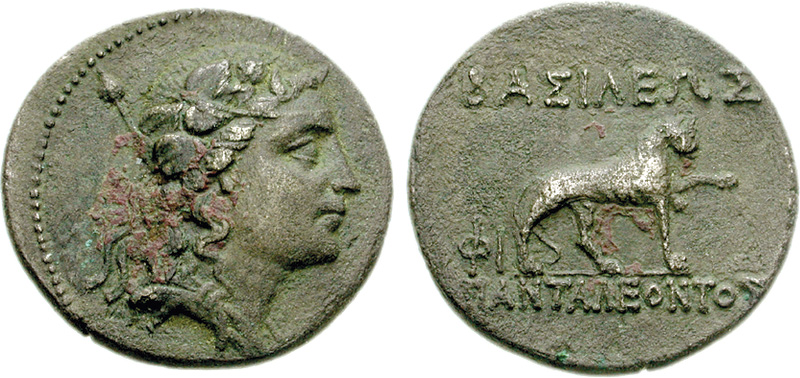
Cupro-nickel coins of king Pantaleon point to a Chinese origin of the metal.

The Indo-Greek kings in Southern Asia issued the first known cupro-nickel coins, with Euthydemus II, dating from 180 to 170 BC, and his younger brothers Pantaleon and Agathocles around 170 BC. As only China was able to produce cupro-nickel at that time, and as the alloy ratios are exclusively similar, it has been suggested that the metal was the result of exchanges between China and Bactria.

An indirect testimony by the Chinese explorer Zhang Qian, who visited Bactria around 128 BC, suggests that intense trade with Southern China was going through northern India. Zhang Qian explains that he found Chinese products in the Bactrian markets, and that they were transiting through northwestern India, which he incidentally describes as a civilization similar to that of Bactria:

"When I was in Bactria", Zhang Qian reported, "I saw bamboo canes from Qiong and cloth (silk?) made in the province of Shu. When I asked the people how they had gotten such articles, they replied: "Our merchants go buy them in the markets of Shendu (northwestern India). Shendu, they told me, lies several thousand li southeast of Bactria. The people cultivate land, and live much like the people of Bactria".

— Sima Qian, "Records of the Great Historian", trans. Burton Watson, p. 236.

Recent excavations at the burial site of China's first Emperor Qin Shi Huang, dating back to the 3rd century BCE, also suggest Greek influence in the artworks found there, including in the manufacture of the famous Terracotta Army. It is also suggested that Greek artists may have come to China at that time to train local artisans in making sculptures.

=== Indian Ocean trade ===
Maritime relations across the Indian Ocean started in the 3rd century BC, and further developed during the time of the Indo-Greeks together with their territorial expansion along the western coast of India. The first contacts started when the Ptolemies constructed the Red Sea ports of Myos Hormos and Berenike, with destination the Indus delta, the Kathiawar peninsula or Muziris. Around 130 BC, Eudoxus of Cyzicus is reported (Strabo, Geog. II.3.4) to have made a successful voyage to India and returned with a cargo of perfumes and gemstones. By the time Indo-Greek rule was ending, up to 120 ships were setting sail every year from Myos Hormos to India (Strabo Geog. II.5.12).

== Armed forces ==
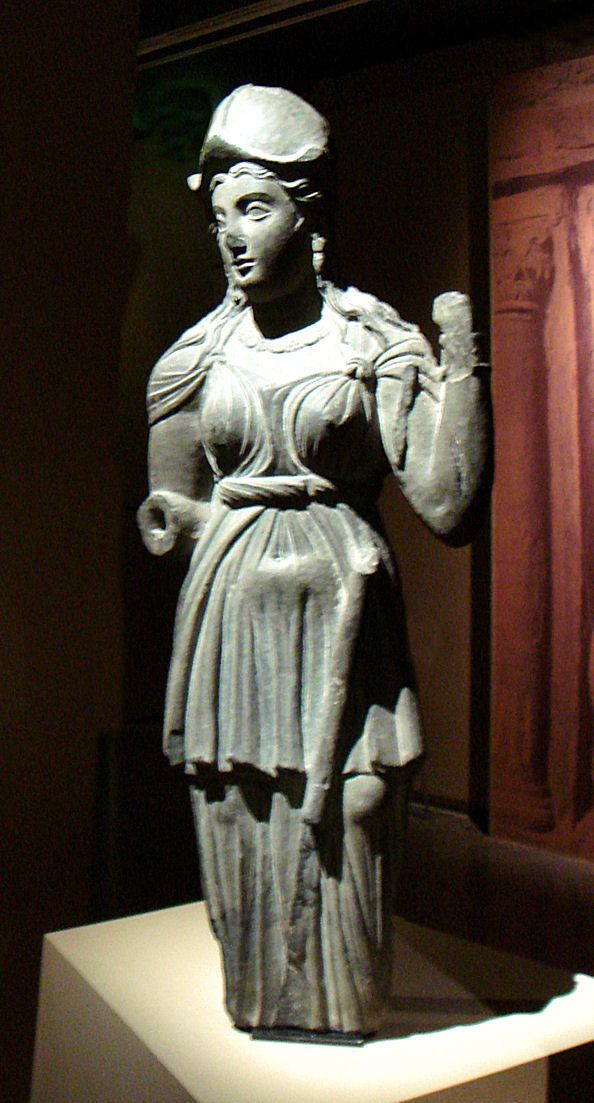
Athena in the art of Gandhara, displayed at the Lahore Museum, Pakistan

The coins of the Indo-Greeks provide rich clues on their uniforms and weapons. Typical Hellenistic uniforms are depicted, with helmets being either round in the Greco-Bactrian style, or the flat kausia of the Macedonians (coins of Apollodotus I).

=== Military technology ===
Their weapons were spears, swords, longbow (on the coins of Agathokleia) and arrows. Around 130 BC, the Central Asian recurve bow of the steppes with its gorytos box started to appear for the first time on the coins of Zoilos I, suggesting strong interactions (and apparently an alliance) with nomadic peoples, either the Yuezhi or the Scythians. The recurve bow becomes a standard feature of Indo-Greek horsemen by 90 BC, as seen on some of the coins of Hermaeus.

Generally, Indo-Greek kings are often represented riding horses, as early as the reign of Antimachus II around 160 BC. The equestrian tradition probably goes back to the Greco-Bactrians, who are said by Polybius to have faced a Seleucid invasion in 210 BC with 10,000 horsemen. Although war elephants are never represented on coins, a harness plate (phalera) dated to the 3rd–2nd century BC, today in the Hermitage Museum, depicts a helmetted Greek combatant on an Indian war elephant.

The Milinda Panha, in the questions of Nagasena to king Menander, provides a rare glimpse of the military methods of the period:

-(Nagasena) Has it ever happened to you, O king, that rival kings rose up against you as enemies and opponents?
-(Menander) Yes, certainly.
-Then you set to work, I suppose, to have moats dug, and ramparts thrown up, and watch towers erected, and strongholds built, and stores of food collected?
-Not at all. All that had been prepared beforehand.
-Or you had yourself trained in the management of war elephants, and in horsemanship, and in the use of the war chariot, and in archery and fencing?
-Not at all. I had learnt all that before.
-But why?
-With the object of warding off future danger.

— (Milinda Panha, Book III, Chap 7)

The Milinda Panha also describes the structure of Menander's army:

Now one day Milinda the king proceeded forth out of the city to pass in review the innumerable host of his mighty army in its fourfold array (of elephants, cavalry, bowmen, and soldiers on foot).

— (Milinda Panha, Book I)

=== Size of Indo-Greek armies ===
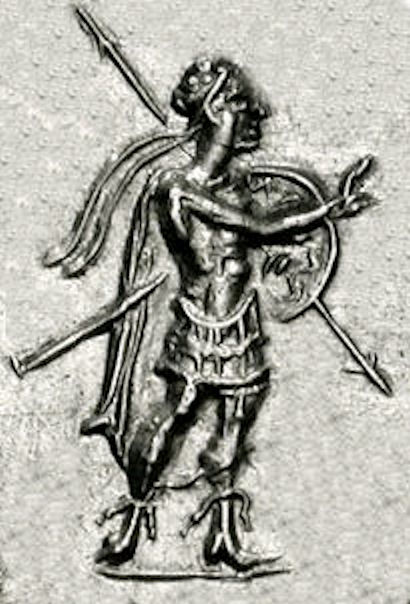
King Strato I in combat uniform, wearing a linothorax with pleats, a chlamys cloak, and boots (krepides), while armed with a spear, shield and sword (held at waist). He is also making a blessing gesture with his right hand; circa 100 BCE.

The armed forces of the Indo-Greeks engaged in battles with other Indian kingdoms. The ruler of Kalinga, King Kharavela, states in the Hathigumpha inscription that during the 8th year of his reign he led a large army in the direction of a Yavana King, and that he forced their demoralized army to retreat to Mathura.

"Then in the eighth year, (Kharavela) with a large army having sacked Goradhagiri causes pressure on Rajagaha (Rajagriha). On account of the loud report of this act of valour, the Yavana (Greek) King Dimi[ta] retreated to Mathura having extricated his demoralized army."

— Hathigumpha inscription, lines 7–8, probably in the 1st century BCE. Original text is in Brahmi script.

The name of the Yavana king is not clear, but it contains three letters, and the middle letter can be read as ma or mi. R. D. Banerji and K.P. Jayaswal read the name of the Yavana king as "Dimita", and identify him with Demetrius I of Bactria. However, according to Ramaprasad Chanda, this identification results in "chronological impossibilities". The Greek ambassador Megasthenes took special note of the military strength of Kalinga in his Indica in the middle of the 3rd century BC:

The royal city of the Calingae (Kalinga) is called Parthalis. Over their king 60,000 foot-soldiers, 1,000 horsemen, 700 elephants keep watch and ward in "procinct of war."

— Megasthenes fragm. LVI. in Plin. Hist. Nat. VI. 21. 8–23. 11.

An account by the Roman writer Justin gives another hint of the size of Indo-Greek armies, which, in the case of the conflict between the Greco-Bactrian Eucratides and the Indo-Greek Demetrius II, he numbers at 60,000 (although they allegedly lost to 300 Greco-Bactrians):

Eucratides led many wars with great courage, and, while weakened by them, was put under siege by Demetrius, king of the Indians. He made numerous sorties, and managed to vanquish 60,000 enemies with 300 soldiers, and thus liberated after four months, he put India under his rule

— Justin, XLI,6

The Indo-Greek armies would be conquered by Indo-Scythians, a nomadic tribe from Central Asia.

== Legacy ==
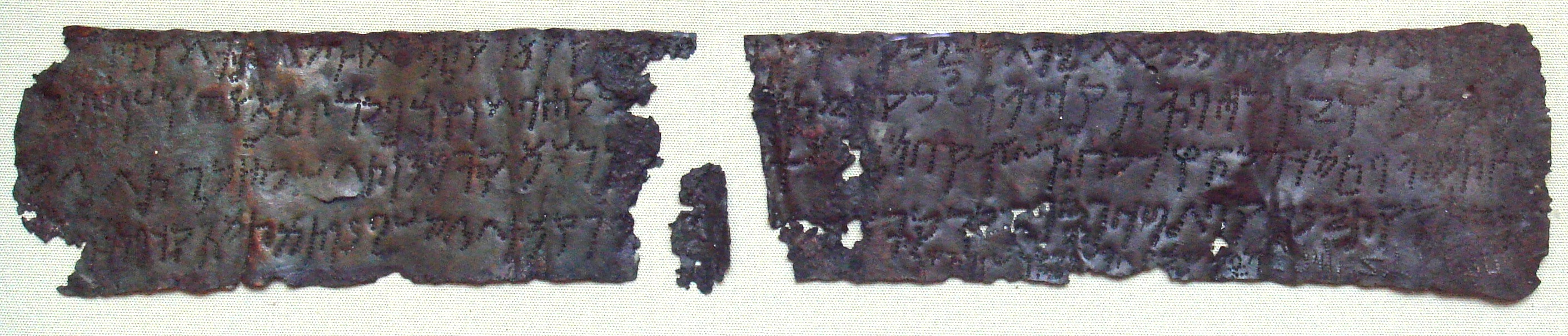
The Indo-Scythian Taxila copper plate uses the Macedonian month of "Panemos" for calendrical purposes (British Museum).

From the 1st century AD, the Greek communities of central Asia and the northwestern Indian subcontinent lived under the control of the Kushan branch of the Yuezhi, apart from a short-lived invasion of the Indo-Parthian Kingdom. The Kushans founded the Kushan Empire, which was to prosper for several centuries. In the south, the Greeks were under the rule of the Western Kshatrapas. The Kalash tribe of the Chitral Valley claim to be descendants of the Indo-Greeks; although this is disputed.

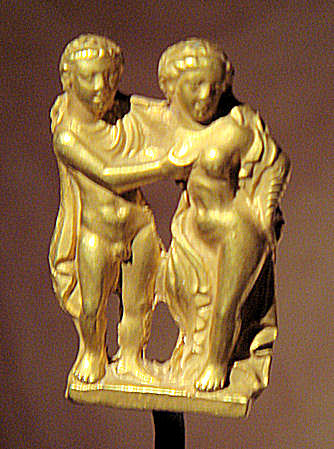
Hellenistic couple from Taxila (Guimet Museum)

It is unclear how much longer the Greeks managed to maintain a distinct presence in the Indian sub-continent. The legacy of the Indo-Greeks was felt however for several centuries, from the usage of the Greek language and calendrical methods, to the influences on the numismatics of the Indian subcontinent, traceable down to the period of the Gupta Empire in the 4th century.

The Greeks may also have maintained a presence in their cities until quite late. Isidorus of Charax in his 1st century AD "Parthian stations" itinerary described an "Alexandropolis, the metropolis of Arachosia", thought to be Alexandria Arachosia, which he said was still Greek even at such a late time:

Beyond is Arachosia. And the Parthians call this White India; there are the city of Biyt and the city of Pharsana and the city of Chorochoad and the city of Demetrias; then Alexandropolis, the metropolis of Arachosia; it is Greek, and by it flows the river Arachotus. As far as this place the land is under the rule of the Parthians.

The Indo-Greeks may also have had some influence on the religious plane as well, especially in relation to the developing Mahayana Buddhism. Mahayana Buddhism has been described as "the form of Buddhism which (regardless of how Hinduized its later forms became) seems to have originated in the Greco-Buddhist communities of India, through a conflation of the Greek Democritean–Sophistic–Pyrrhonist tradition with the rudimentary and unformalized empirical and skeptical elements already present in early Buddhism".

== Chronology ==
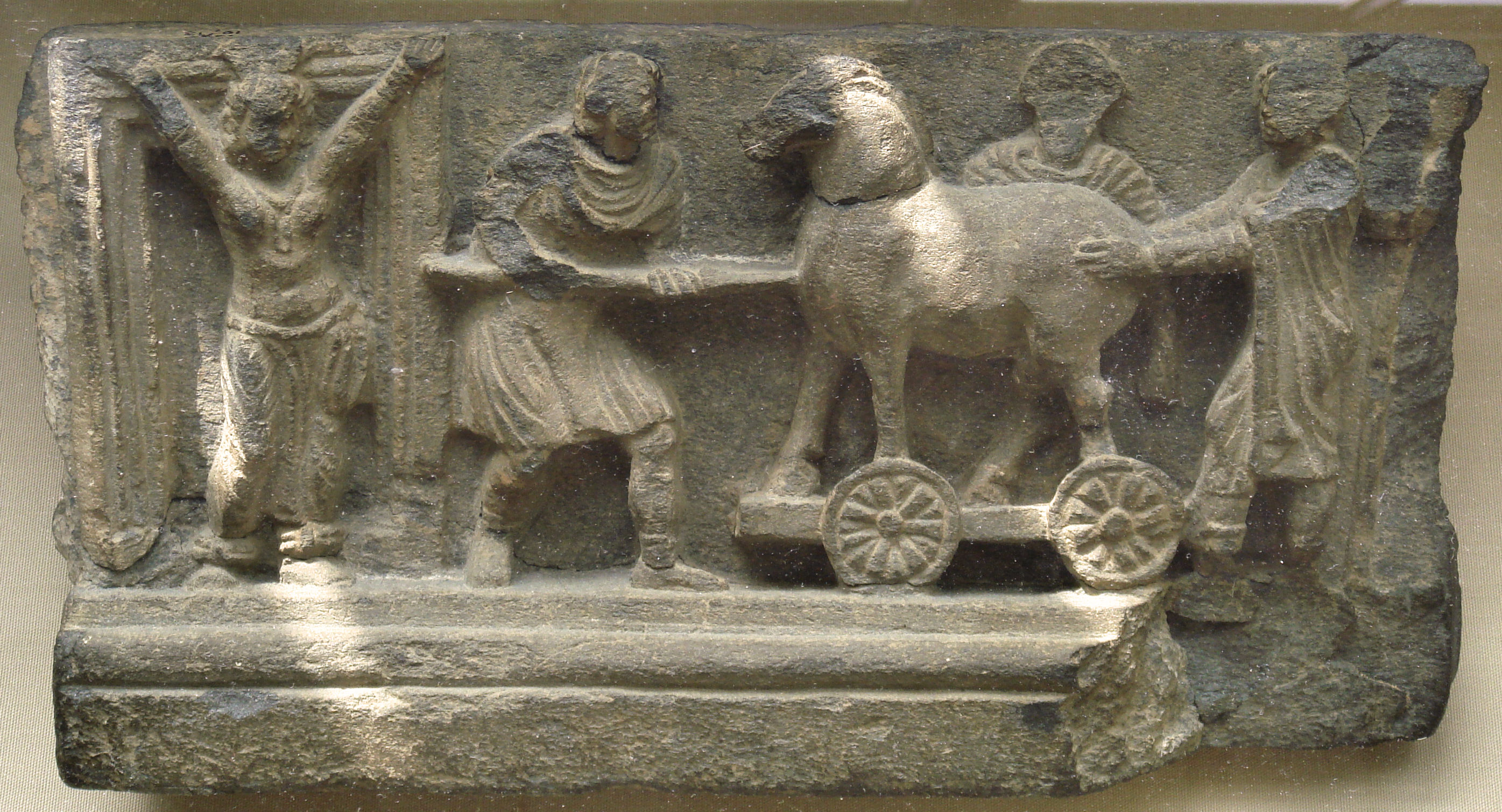
The story of the Trojan horse was depicted in the art of Gandhara. (British Museum).

Today 36 Indo-Greek kings are known. Several of them are also recorded in Western and Indian historical sources, but the majority are known through numismatic evidence only. The exact chronology and sequencing of their rule is still a matter of scholarly inquiry, with adjustments regular being made with new analysis and coin finds (overstrikes of one king over another's coins being the most critical element in establishing chronological sequences).

There is an important evolution of coin shape (round to square) and material (from gold to silver to brass) across the territories and the periods, and from Greek type to Indian type over a period of nearly 3 centuries. Also, the quality of coinage illustration decreases down to the 1st century AD. Coinage evolution is an important point of Indo-Greek history, and actually one of the most important since most of these kings are only known by their coins, and their chronology is mainly established by the evolution of the coin types.

The system used here is adapted from Osmund Bopearachchi, supplemented by the views of R C Senior and occasionally other authorities.

Greco-Bactrian and Indo-Greek kings, their coins, territories and chronology – Based on Bopearachchi (1991)
	Greco-Bactrian kings		Indo-Greek kings					
Territories/ dates	West Bactria	East Bactria	Paropamisade	Arachosia	Gandhara	Western Punjab	Eastern Punjab	Mathura
326–325 BCE	Campaigns of Alexander the Great in India							
312 BCE	Creation of the Seleucid Empire							
305 BCE	Seleucid Empire after Mauryan war							
280 BCE	Foundation of Ai-Khanoum							
255–239 BCE	Independence of the Greco-Bactrian kingdom by Diodotus I							
239–223 BCE	Diodotus II							
230–200 BCE	Euthydemus I							
200–190 BCE	Demetrius I							
190–185 BCE	Euthydemus II							
190–180 BCE	Agathocles			Pantaleon				
185–170 BCE	Antimachus I							
180–160 BCE			Apollodotus I					
175–170 BCE	Demetrius II							
160–155 BCE			Antimachus II					
170–145 BCE	Eucratides I							
155–130 BCE	Yuezhi occupation, loss of Ai-Khanoum	Eucratides II; Plato; Heliocles I	Menander I					
130–120 BCE	Yuezhi occupation		Zoilos I		Agathoclea			Yavanarajya inscription
120–110 BCE			Lysias		Strato I			Yavanarajya inscription
110–100 BCE			Antialcidas		Heliocles II			Yavanarajya inscription
100 BCE			Polyxenus		Demetrius III			Yavanarajya inscription
100–95 BCE			Philoxenus					Yavanarajya inscription
95–90 BCE			Diomedes	Amyntas		Epander		Yavanarajya inscription
90 BCE			Theophilus	Peucolaus		Thraso		Yavanarajya inscription
90–85 BCE			Nicias	Menander II		Artemidorus		Yavanarajya inscription
90–70 BCE			Hermaeus	Archebius				Yavanarajya inscription
			Yuezhi occupation		Maues (Indo-Scythian)			
75–70 BCE					Telephos	Apollodotus II		
65–55 BCE						Hippostratos	Dionysios	
55–35 BCE						Azes I (Indo-Scythian)	Zoilos II	
55–35 BCE							Apollophanes	
25 BCE – 10 CE							Strato II and Strato III	
							Zoilos III/ Bhadayasa	
							Rajuvula (Indo-Scythian)	

== See also ==
- Greco-Bactrian Kingdom
- Yavana era
- Yavana Kingdom
- Seleucid Empire
- Greco-Buddhism
- Gandharan Buddhism
- Indo-Scythians
- India (Herodotus)
- Indo-Parthian Kingdom
- Kandahar Greek Inscription
- Kandahar Bilingual Rock Inscription
- Kushan Empire
- Roman commerce
- Timeline of Indo-Greek Kingdoms
- Gandhāra (mahajanapada)
- Partition of Babylon

Timeline and cultural period	Indus plain (Punjab-Sapta Sindhu-Gujarat)	Gangetic Plain			Central India	Southern India
Timeline and cultural period	Indus plain (Punjab-Sapta Sindhu-Gujarat)	Upper Gangetic Plain (Ganga-Yamuna doab)	Middle Gangetic Plain	Lower Gangetic Plain	Central India	Southern India
IRON AGE
Culture	Late Vedic Period	Late Vedic Period; Painted Grey Ware culture	Late Vedic Period; Northern Black Polished Ware		Pre-history	
6th century BCE	Gandhara	Kuru-Panchala	Magadha		Adivasi (tribes)	Assaka
Culture	Persian-Greek influences	"Second Urbanisation"; Rise of Shramana movements Jainism - Buddhism - Ājīvika - Yoga			Pre-history	
5th century BCE	(Persian conquests)		Shaishunaga dynasty		Adivasi (tribes)	Assaka
4th century BCE	(Greek conquests)	Nanda empire				
HISTORICAL AGE
Culture	Spread of Buddhism				Pre-history	
3rd century BCE	Maurya Empire					Satavahana dynasty Sangam period (300 BCE – 200 CE); Early Cholas; Early Pandyan kingdom Cheras
Culture	Preclassical Hinduism (Note: Michaels (2004) p.39) - "Hindu Synthesis" (Note: Hiltebeitel (2002)) (ca. 200 BCE - 300 CE) (Note: Michaels (2004) p.39) (Note: Hiltebeitel (2002)); Epics - Puranas - Ramayana - Mahabharata - Bhagavad Gita - Brahma Sutras - Smarta Tradition; Mahayana Buddhism					
2nd century BCE	Indo-Greek Kingdom		Shunga Empire; Maha-Meghavahana Dynasty			Satavahana dynasty Sangam period (300 BCE – 200 CE); Early Cholas; Early Pandyan kingdom Cheras
1st century BCE	Indo-Greek Kingdom		Shunga Empire; Maha-Meghavahana Dynasty			Satavahana dynasty Sangam period (300 BCE – 200 CE); Early Cholas; Early Pandyan kingdom Cheras
1st century CE	Indo-Scythians; Indo-Parthians		Kuninda Kingdom			Satavahana dynasty Sangam period (300 BCE – 200 CE); Early Cholas; Early Pandyan kingdom Cheras
2nd century	Kushan Empire					Satavahana dynasty Sangam period (300 BCE – 200 CE); Early Cholas; Early Pandyan kingdom Cheras
3rd century	Kushano-Sasanian Kingdom; Western Satraps	Kushan Empire		Kamarupa kingdom	Adivasi (tribes)	Satavahana dynasty Sangam period (300 BCE – 200 CE); Early Cholas; Early Pandyan kingdom Cheras
Culture	"Golden Age of Hinduism"(ca. CE 320-650) (Note: Michaels (2004) p.40); Puranas - Kural; Co-existence of Hinduism and Buddhism					
4th century	Kidarites	Gupta Empire; Varman dynasty				Andhra Ikshvakus; Kalabhra dynasty Kadamba Dynasty; Western Ganga Dynasty
5th century	Hephthalite Empire	Alchon Huns				Vishnukundina; Kalabhra dynasty
6th century	Nezak Huns; Kabul Shahi; Maitraka				Adivasi (tribes)	Vishnukundina; Badami Chalukyas; Kalabhra dynasty
Culture	Late-Classical Hinduism (ca. CE 650-1100) (Note: Michaels (2004) p.41); Advaita Vedanta - Tantra; Decline of Buddhism in India					
7th century	Indo-Sassanids		Vakataka dynasty Empire of Harsha	Mlechchha dynasty	Adivasi (tribes)	Badami Chalukyas; Eastern Chalukyas; Pandyan kingdom (revival); Pallava
7th century	Karkota dynasty				Adivasi (tribes)	
8th century	Kabul Shahi	Pala Empire			Adivasi (tribes)	Eastern Chalukyas; Pandyan kingdom Kalachuri
9th century	Gurjara-Pratihara				Adivasi (tribes)	Rashtrakuta Empire; Eastern Chalukyas; Pandyan kingdom Medieval Cholas; Chera Perumals of Makkotai
10th century	Ghaznavids			Pala dynasty Kamboja-Pala dynasty	Adivasi (tribes)	Kalyani Chalukyas; Eastern Chalukyas; Medieval Cholas; Chera Perumals of Makkotai; Rashtrakuta
References and sources for table References Sources: Flood, Gavin D. (1996), An Introduction to Hinduism, Cambridge University Press; Hiltebeitel, Alf (2002), Hinduism. In: Joseph Kitagawa, "The Religious Traditions of Asia: Religion, History, and Culture", Routledge; Michaels, Axel (2004), Hinduism. Past and present, Princeton, New Jersey: Princeton University Press
