= Diodotid dynasty =

Hellenistic dynasty

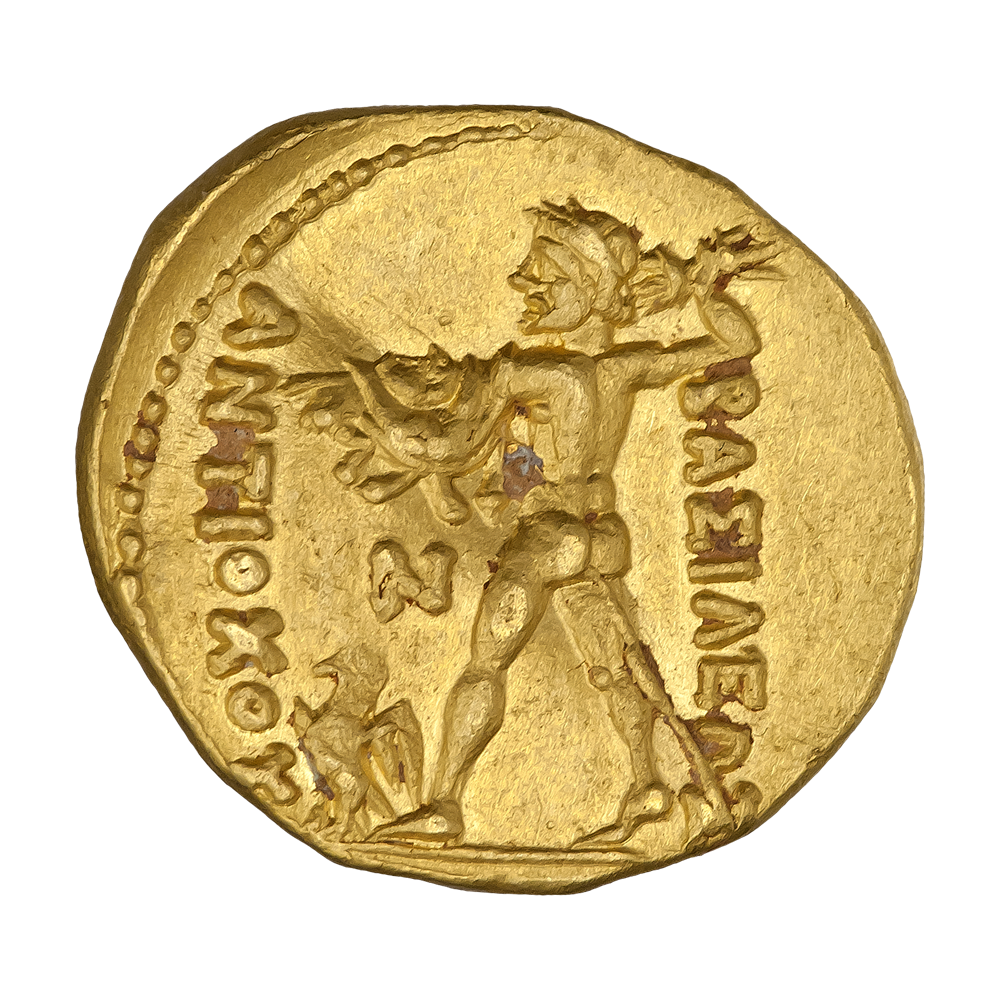
- Coin of Diodotus Soter, with thundering Zeus serving as the symbol of the Diodotids
- Country: Greco-Bactria
- Founded: c. 255 BC
- Founder: Diodotus I
- Final ruler: Diodotus II
- Titles: Basileus of Bactria
- Dissolution: c. 225 BC

The Diodotid dynasty was a Hellenistic dynasty founded by Seleucid viceroy Diodotus I Soter c. 255 BC, ruling the far-eastern Kingdom of Bactria. The Diodotids were the first independent Greek kings to rule in Bactria.

The origins of the Diodotids are unknown. Antiochus Nicator, a proposed Greco-Bactrian king c. 230s BC, would have belonged to the Diodotid dynasty (his existence as a distinct Greco-Bactrian ruler is controversial, and his coins may have represented Seleucid authority). Diodotus II Theos was the last Diodotid ruler of Bactria. His reign was marked by his controversial alliance with the Parthians against the Seleucid Empire. Diodotus II was deposed c. 235-225 BC by Euthydemus, founder of the Euthydemid dynasty, thus ending the dynasty's rule over the Greco-Bactrian Kingdom.

== Family Tree ==
This is a theoretical family tree of the Diodotid kings of Bactria, including the Seleucid king Antiochus II and Queen Laodice I (for a more detailed family tree, see Family Tree of the Greco-Bactrian and Indo-Greek Kings).

Theoretical Family Tree of the Diodotid Kings of Bactria

Antiochus II and Laodice I
Diodotus I | daughter of Antiochus II and Laodice I?
Diodotus II | Antiochus Nicator (proposed)
Agathocles of Bactria (proposed, illegitimate)
