= Battle of the Arius =

208 BC battle

- Part of Antiochus's Bactrian Campaign
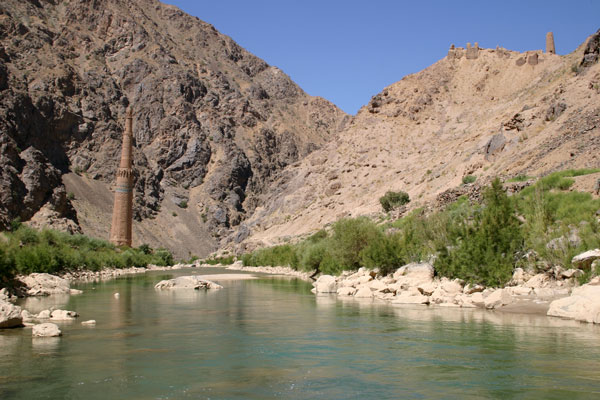
- The Arius (Hari) river
Date	208 BC
Location	Arius River (Modern day Hari River, Afghanistan)
Result	Seleucid victory

Belligerents
Seleucid Empire	Greco-Bactrian Kingdom

Commanders and leaders
Antiochus III the Great	Euthydemus I

Strength
unknown	10,000 Cataphracts

Casualties and losses
at least 2000 horsemen KIA	2,000–2,500 Cataphracts

The Battle of the Arius was an engagement that was fought in 208 BC between the Seleucid Empire and the Greco-Bactrian Kingdom. The Seleucids were led by Antiochus III the Great, who launched an invasion of Bactria to recover his ancestor's past dominions. He would go on to be victorious in this battle, and would later go on to besiege the Bactrians at their capital of Bactra for three years.

== Location ==
The location of the Arius was near the Arius River (now known Hari River). The river flows through the parts of modern-day Afghanistan and Turkmenistan. It flows through the Hindu Kush Mountains. It forms the border between Afghanistan and Iran at one of its points.

== Prelude ==
Antiochus III the Great was a ruler of the Seleucid Empire whose ancestor and namesake, Antiochus II, originally ruled much of the area that would then make up the Greco-Bactrian Kingdom in 255 BC. He had been reconquering past dominions until he moved into Bactria in the year 209 BC. The year had seen Antiochus in Bactria, moving to restore his ancestor's realm in the far east and himself gain much more territory. He faced the rebel Euthydemus, a ruler of Bactria who had himself usurped the original usurpers descendants. Antiochus had gained successes in his conquest but then prepared to meet him in battle.

== Battle ==
The battle of Arius was fought in 208 BC and took place near the Arius River at daybreak. The Seleucids had advanced into the Greco-Bactrian territory as part of an expedition to gain back the land they had lost after Antiochus II's death. Getting wind of this, Euthydemus was soon on hand leading 10,000 cataphracts, after marching for three days from Tapuria to meet the Seleucid army.

Antiochus had received word that the Bactrians would guard the river throughout the day, but when it became night, they retired to a city twenty stadia off. He then used this to his advantage and crossed the majority of his army under the cover of night.

Upon learning of this, Euthydemus and his cataphracts began riding to the Arius to meet the Seleucid army. Upon learning of the impending Greco-Bactrian charge, Antiochus rallied 2,000 of his best horsemen to meet the charge. In the engagement, Antiochus is described as having fought with the most gallantry in his entire army. There were severe losses on both sides, when Antiochus's horsemen defeated the advance guard, two more squadrons of cavalry arrived and inflicted heavy losses on the Seleucids. One of Antiochus' officers, Panaetolus, upon noticing that the 2,000 cavalrymen were nearly all dead, ordered his peltasts to relieve Antiochus and inflicted losses on the Bactrians.

Meanwhile, as Panaetolus countered the Bactrians, Antiochus regrouped what remained of his cavalry and took many prisoners, later withdrawing to the other side of the river. As they were withdrawing, Antiochus had a horse killed under him, losing some of his teeth by a blow to the mouth. After seeing his losses, Euthydemus retreated back to his capital, Bactra.

== Aftermath ==
Although Antiochus may have won this battle, he later besieged the Bactrians at Bactria from 208 BC to 206 BC, but was unable to take the city. He eventually signed a peace treaty with Euthydemus and obtaining war elephants in exchange for the hand of his daughter to Euthydemus's son, Demetrius.

== See also ==
- Siege of Bactra
