= Diodotus II =

- Basileus
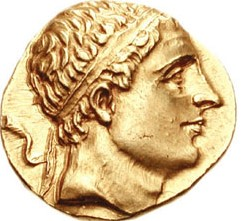
- Diodotus II depicted on one of his coins

King of Bactria
- Reign: c. 235 – 225 BC
- Predecessor: Diodotus I
- Successor: Euthydemus I
- Died: c. 225 BC; Bactria
- Dynasty: Diodotid
- Father: Diodotus I

Diodotus II Theos (Greek: Διόδοτος Θεός, Diódotos Theós, "Diodotus the God"; r. 235 – 225 BC) was the son and successor of Diodotus I Soter, who rebelled against the Seleucid Empire, establishing the Graeco-Bactrian Kingdom. Diodotus II probably ruled alongside his father as co-regent, before succeeding him as sole king around 235 BC. He prevented Seleucid efforts to reincorporate Bactria back into the empire, by allying with the Parthians against them. He was murdered around 225 BC by Euthydemus I, who succeeded him as king.

Diodotus's career was recounted by Apollodorus of Artemita in the Parthian History, but this text is lost, and surviving literary sources only mention him in passing. Thus, most details of Diodotus's life and career have to be reconstructed from numismatics.

== Background and co-regency ==
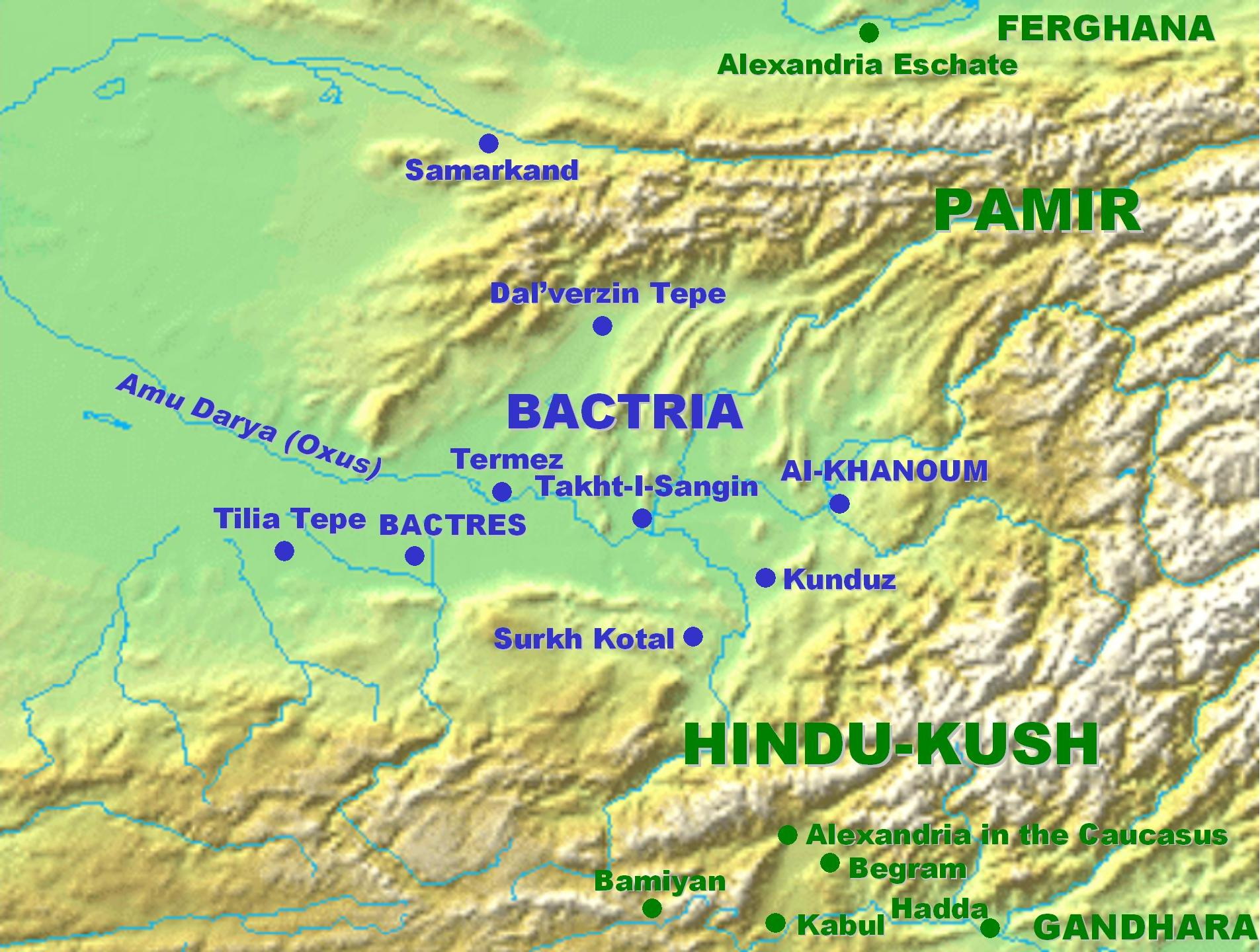
Map of major sites in Bactria.

The Seleucid Empire gained control of Bactria and the surrounding regions between 308 and 305 BC and made it a satrapy (province) of their empire. Diodotus's father, Diodotus I ruled the region of Bactria as a satrap (governor) some time in the 260s BC and gradually drifted into independence during the reign of the Seleucid king Antiochus II Theos (261-246 BC). The process culminated in Diodotus I's proclamation of himself as king sometime between 255 and 245 BC.

Coinage minted under Diodotus I derives from two separate mints. The coinage of one mint features a mature man on the obverse—generally identified as Diodotus I, while the obverse of coinage produced at the other mint depicts a similar, but younger, figure. Frank L. Holt proposes that the latter was Diodotus II. He suggests that Diodotus was entrusted with control of a portion of the realm that included the second mint. This arrangement would follow the model laid down by the Seleucids, who had made a practice of appointing the crown prince as co-regent and entrusting them with government of the eastern portion of the empire (including Bactria). The location of the region under Diodotus II's control is unknown; Holt tentatively suggests that he controlled the western region which was exposed to raids from Parthia and had his base at Bactra.

== Reign ==
During his reign, Diodotus I had expelled the Parni king Arsaces I from Bactria. Arsaces had gone on to seize the region of Parthia from the Seleucids and carved out his own kingdom in what is now northeastern Iran. Diodotus I remained opposed to the Parni and thus aligned with the Seleucids. On his accession, Diodotus II reversed his father's policy:

Soon after, relieved by the death of Diodotus [I], Arsaces made peace and concluded an alliance with his son, also by the name of Diodotus; some time later he fought against Seleucus [II] who came to punish the rebels, but he prevailed: the Parthians celebrated this day as the one that marked the beginning of their freedom

— Justin, 41.4

This battle between Seleucus II and Arsaces took place around 228 BC. It is unclear whether Diodotus was actively involved in the battle or simply agreed to remain neutral, thereby leaving Arsaces free to bring all his forces to bear on the invading Seleucid army.

Sometime after this, around 225 BC, Diodotus was killed by Euthydemus I, who usurped the throne and founded the Euthydemid dynasty. W. W. Tarn proposed that Diodotus I had married a Seleucid princess as a second wife and had a daughter who was married to Euthydemus, making him Diodotus II's brother-in-law. There is, however, no evidence for the existence of either of these women and the theory no longer enjoys credence with contemporary scholars. Archaeological evidence reveals that the city of Ai-Khanoum was besieged around 225 BC, an event which Holt connects with Euthydemus's seizure of power. It seems therefore that there was a period of civil war, culminating in Euthydemus's victory—a reconstruction that seems to be confirmed by numismatic evidence.

Most scholars have treated the alliance with Arsaces as a response to the threat from Seleucus II. Tarn suggested that Euthydemus I's usurpation was a reaction to the alliance. Frank Holt proposes the opposite: that the alliance with Arsaces was a response to the outbreak of civil war with Euthydemus.

== Coinage ==
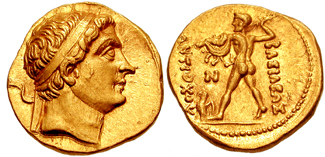
Gold stater of Diodotus I, with Greek legend ΒΑΣΙΛΕΩΣ ΑΝΤΙΟΧΟΥ – "Of King Antiochus"

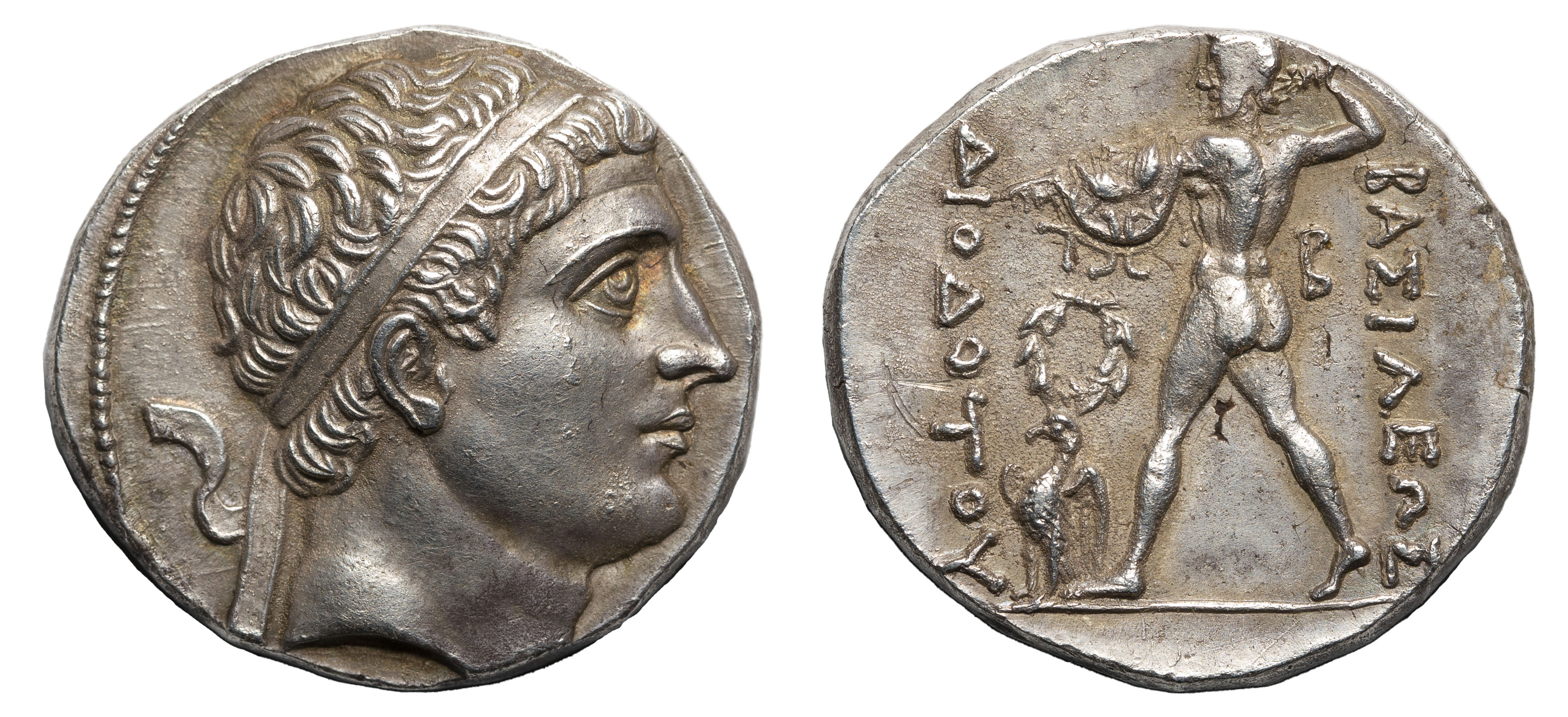
Silver tetradrachm of Diodotus II. Obverse: Diademed head of Diodotos I to right. Reverse: ΒΑΣΙΛΕΩΣ - ΔΙΟΔΟΤΟΥ, Zeus advancing left.

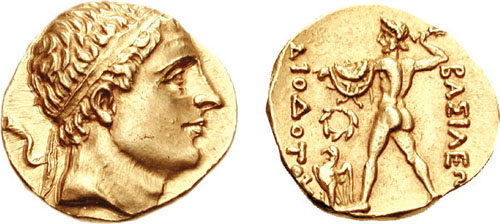
Gold stater of Diodotus II, with Greek legend ΒΑΣΙΛΕΩΣ ΔΙΟΔΟΤΟΥ – "of King Diodotus"

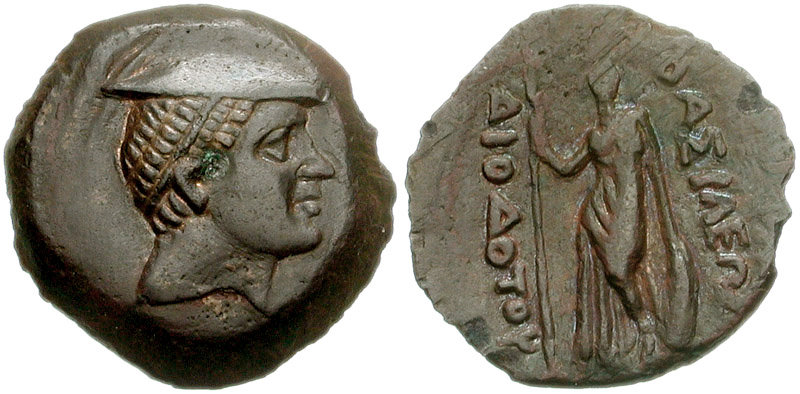
Bronze single of Diodotus I, with Greek legend ΒΑΣΙΛΕΩΣ ΔΙΟΔΟΤΟΥ – "of King Diodotus" (Series H)

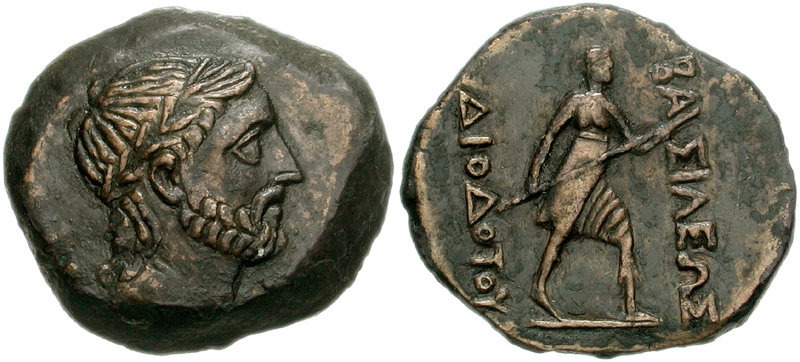
Bronze single of Diodotus I, with Greek legend ΒΑΣΙΛΕΩΣ ΔΙΟΔΟΤΟΥ – "of King Diodotus" (Series I)

Diodotus II largely continued the minting patterns laid down by his father. There were two mints, which issued gold, silver and bronze coinage. The precious metal coinage consisted of gold staters and silver tetradrachms, drachms, and hemidrachms on the Attic weight standard. These coins have the head of a male figure on the obverse shown wearing the diadem—a band of cloth wrapped around the head, with two strips hanging down the back, which had been the standard symbol of Hellenistic kingship since the time of Alexander the Great. The reverse of these coins depicted Zeus preparing to throw his thunderbolt. As mentioned above, during Diodotus I's reign, two different figures appeared on the obverses—an older figure ('series A') and a younger figure ('series C & E'), who are identified with Diodotus I and Diodotus II respectively. Series A and C probably minted at Ai-Khanoum or at Bactra, while Series E was minted at a second mint, which Frank Holt tentatively identifies with Bactra. This mint produced coinage in a smaller quantity and at a lower quality than that of the Ai-Khanoum/Bactra mint. He proposes that the small series C was minted at the main mint in order to establish Diodotus II's position as heir apparent of the whole kingdom.

After a break, both mints produce coins with the younger portrait and with the legend now Ancient Greek: ΒΑΣΙΛΕΩΣ ΔΙΟΔΟΤΟΥ ('Of Diodotus', 'series D & F'), whereas the legend on the earlier coins was Ancient Greek: ΒΑΣΙΛΕΩΣ ΑΝΤΙΟΧΟΥ ('Of King Antiochus'). Holt suggests that this break marks the death of Diodotus I and accession of Diodotus II. This shift in legends seems to reflect the final renunciation of Seleucid authority and a full proclamation of Bactrian independence.

For the majority of his reign, Diodotus II issued coinage on a relatively modest scale. Towards the end of his reign, he began to mint on a much larger scale, with greater quantities of gold coinage than previously. This was accompanied by the production of an issue at the secondary mint, depicting the older figure of Diodotus I once more, but in a more idealised fashion ('series B'). Frank Holt proposes that these phenomena were a consequence of a civil war between Diodotus II and Euthydemus. He argues that the scale of minting indicates the need to provide coinage for a large number of soldiers—indicating some kind of military threat—while the series B coinage may have been intended to emphasise Diodotus II's legitimacy as son of the kingdom's founder.

Diodotus II also issued a bronze coinage. Initially, this coinage bore the same obverse design as that of Diodotus I: head of Hermes wearing a petasus hat ('Series H'). However, the reverse design is new: a depiction of Athena resting on her spear and the introduction of a new legend, reading Ancient Greek: ΒΑΣΙΛΕΩΣ ΔΙΟΔΟΤΟΥ ("of King Diodotus"), as on the gold and silver coinage. The coinage consisted of four denominations: a 'double' (c. 8.4 grammes, 20-24 millimetres in diameter), a 'single' (4.2 g, 14–18 mm), a 'half' (2.1g, 10–12 mm), and a 'quarter' (1 g, 8–10 mm). Only the first two of these denominations seem to be attested under Diodotus I. The value of these denominations is uncertain; a single may have been worth 1/48 of a silver drachm. After this initial issue, Diodotus introduced a new set of designs ('Series I'). On the double and single denominations, these depict the head of Zeus on the obverse (except on one issue depicting a king—probably by accident), and the goddess Artemis on the reverse. On the quarters, they have an eagle on the obverse and a quiver on the reverse (symbols of Zeus and Artemis respectively). These bronze coins were found in very large numbers in the excavations of Ai-Khanoum and in smaller quantities at Gyaur Gala (Merv, Turkmenistan) and Takht-i Sangin. The profusion of bronze coinage, whose value was token, especially in the very smallest denominations, indicates the progressive monetisation taking place in Bactria by the time of Diodotus II.

Diodotus also appears on coins struck in his memory by the later Graeco-Bactrian kings Agathocles and Antimachus I. These coins imitate the original design of the tetradrachms issued by Diodotus II, but with a legend on the obverse identifying the king as Ancient Greek: Διοδοτου Θεου ('Of Diodotus Theos').

== Bibliography ==
- Holt, Frank L. (1999). Thundering Zeus: The Making of Hellenistic Bactria. Berkeley, CA: University of California Press. p. 221. ISBN 0520211405.

Preceded by Diodotus I	Greco-Bactrian Ruler; 239 – 230 BC	Succeeded by Euthydemus I (or possibly Antiochus Nicator)
