= Agathocles of Bactria =

Agathocles Dicaeus
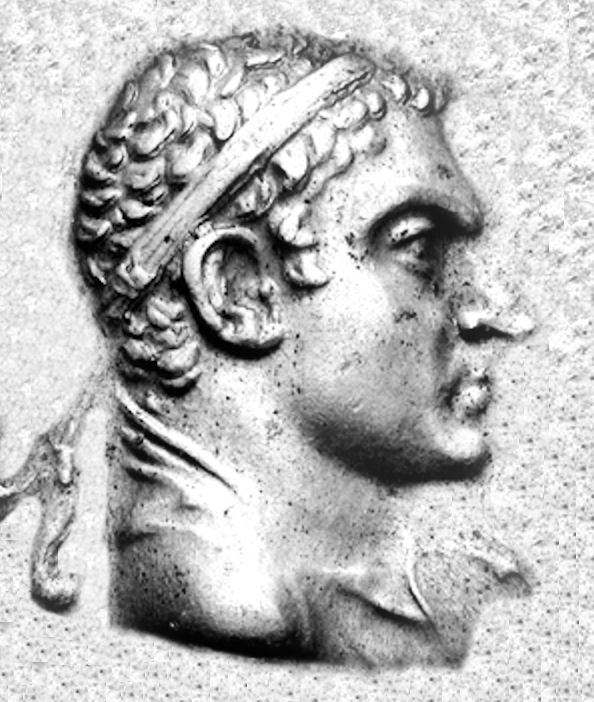
- Portrait of Agathocles

Indo-Greek king
- Reign: 190–180 BC
- Predecessor: Pantaleon
- Successor: Apollodotus I or Antimachus I
- Dynasty: Euthydemid
- Father: Demetrius I
- Mother: Daughter of Antiochus III and Laodice III

Agathocles I Dicaeus (Ancient Greek: Ἀγαθοκλῆς Δικαῖος, romanized: Agathoklês Dikaîos, meaning "Agathocles the Just") was a Greco-Bactrian/Indo-Greek king, who reigned between around 190 and 180 BC. He was likely from the dynasty of Euthydemus I, but he is also known to have commemorated both Diodotus I and Antiochus Nicator. It has been proposed to be an illegitimate son of Diodotus II.

== Accounts and discovery ==
There is a near-complete lack of written sources except an extensive coinage.

Agathocles was first discovered by Johann Martin Honigberger in 1834, with hoards of coins being discovered at a rapid pace. No sooner had Desiré-Raoul Rochette held him to be the founder of the Bactrian dynasty than he was rejected by Christian Lassen, who felt that Agathocles was a contemporary of Demetrius and Eucratides I.

== Biography ==
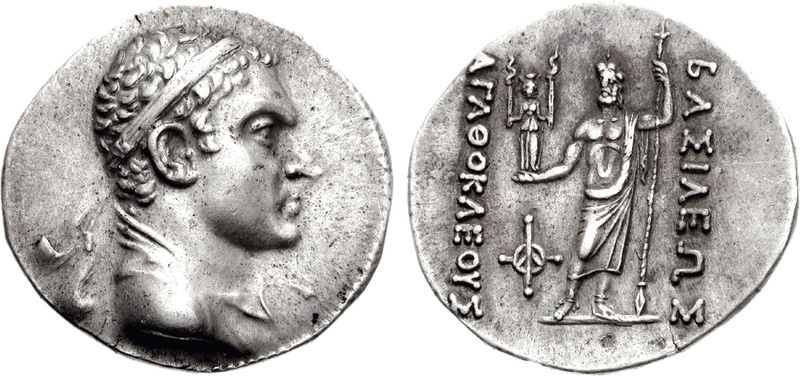
Silver coin of king Agathocles. The obverse shows the king's portrait wearing a diadem. The reverse shows standing Zeus holding goddess Hecate in hand. The Greek Legend reads: ΒΑΣΙΛΕΩΣ ΑΓΑΘΟΚΛΕΟΥΣ, Basileōs Agathokleous, "of King Agathocles".

Agathocles's father may have been Diodotus II, and he would therefore have been illegitimate. Agathocles ruled c. 185 BC (Note: The precise spans of rule for these kings are uncertain. Bopearachchi (1991) dates Agathocles to 185-175 BC.) and was probably the immediate successor of Pantaleon; he was a contemporaneous relative (maybe, son) of Demetrius I, who was busy expanding towards India. (Note: The intricacies of Bactrian Kingship remain understudied.)

He was challenged by Antimachus I. It is not known what happened; he was either immediately ousted by Antimachus I or a few years later, by an usurper Eucratides I.

== Coinage ==
No gold mints have been found. Bronze and silver mints were commonplace. Copper mints having significant Nickel were discovered by Flight in 1868; François Widemann believes them to have had an intermediate value between bronze and silver.

=== Commemorative coinage ===
Agathocles issued a series of coins mentioning a variety of rulers.

The first of these types was acquired by a Russian explorer Nicholai de Khanikoff from Bukhara and published by Jean-Jacques Barthélemy: on the obverse was the usual image of Diodotus but with an epithet of ΣΩΤΗΡΟΣ ("savior") instead of basileus and on the reverse was the usual image of Zeus but with an additional inscription that read "ΒΑΣΙΛΕΥΟΝΤΟΣ ΑΓΑΘΟΚΛΕΟΥΣ ΔΙΚΑΙΟΥ" (Agathocles the Just, ruling as a King). This peculiar coinage led to significant debate among numismatists — Barthélemy had construed the coins to venerate a dead ancestor but Johann Gustav Droysen argued, to significant acclaim, that it meant Agathocles was ruling as a subordinate of Diodotus. (Note: Droysen had construed the participle ΒΑΣΙΛΕΥΟΝΤΟΣ to refer to a subordinate position. Barthélemy was not convinced and issued a line-by-line rebut.)

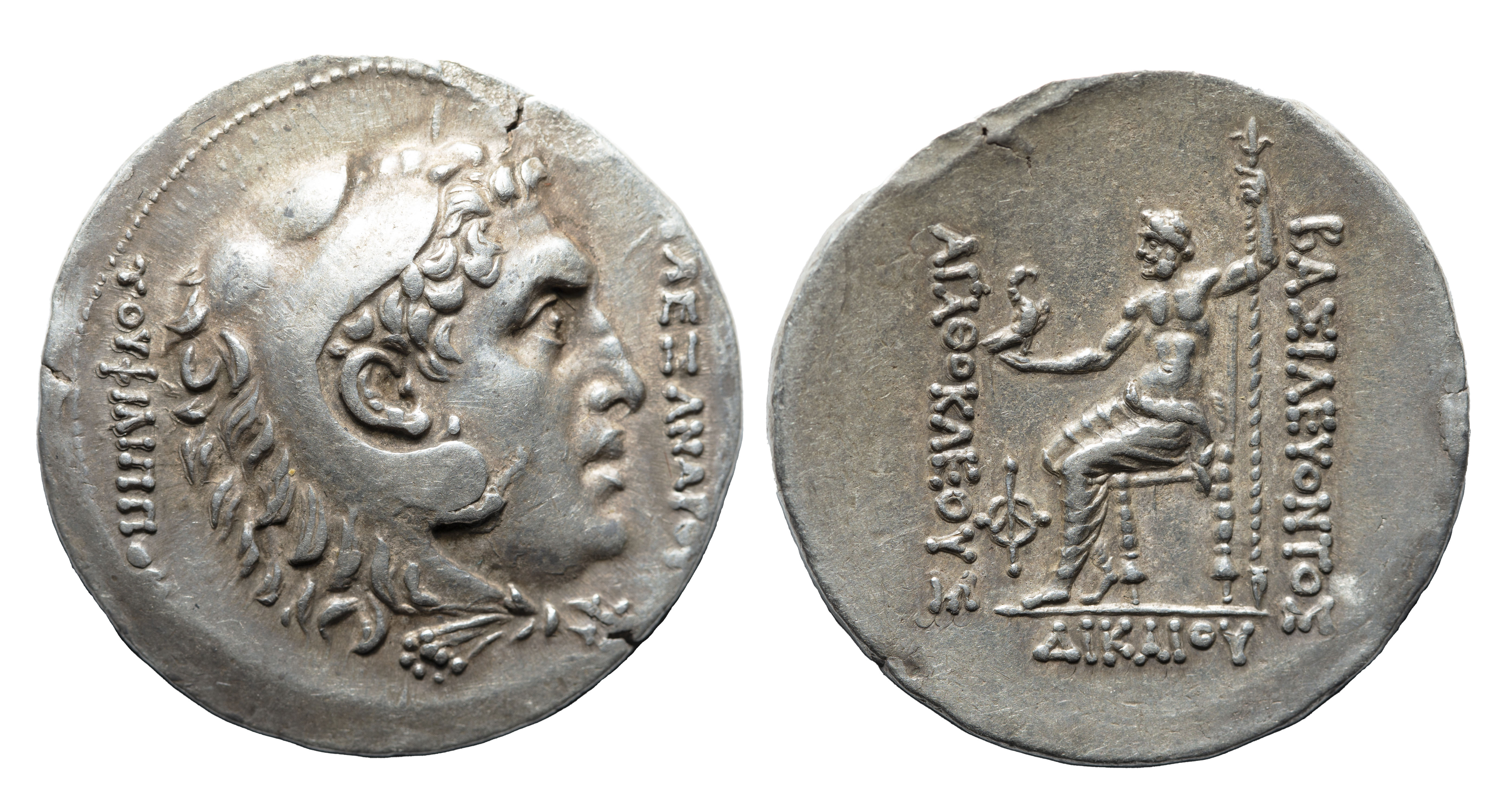
Agathocles's commemorative coin for Alexander the Great

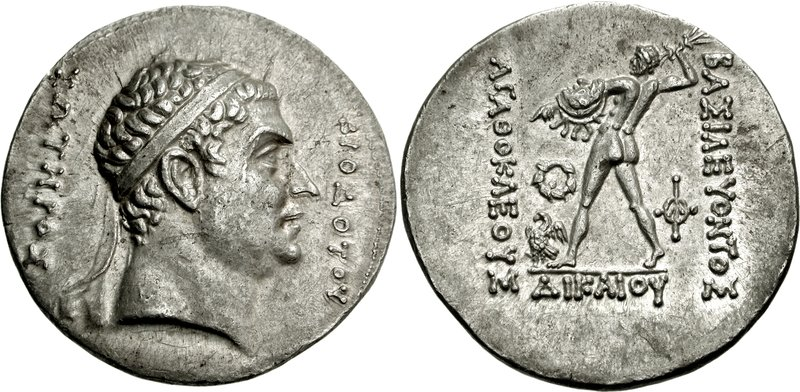
Agathocles's commemorative coin for Diodotus I in the name of Antiochus II

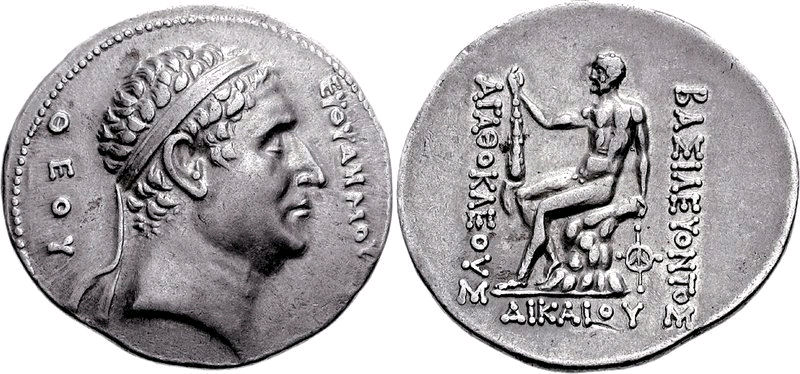
Agathocles's commemorative coin for Euthydemus I

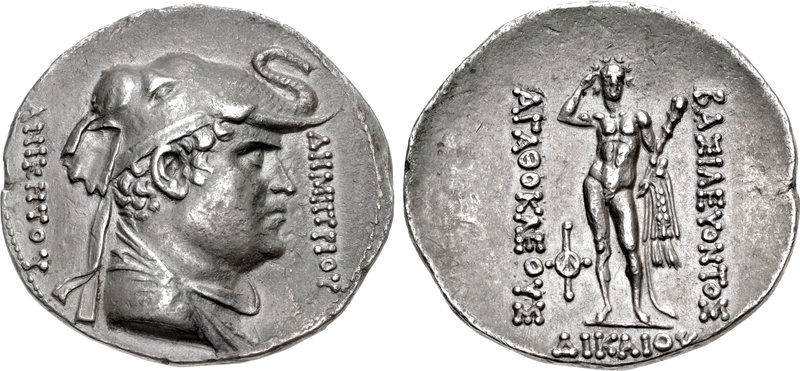
Agathocles's commemorative coin for Demetrius

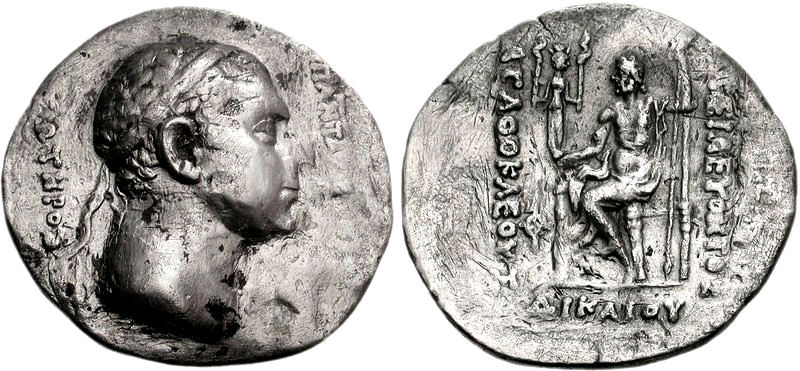
Agathocles's commemorative coin for Pantaleon

Precisely similar coins but commemorating other rulers were located in the following decades—Euthydemus (1858) and Antiochus (1868). A coin of the same kind commemorating Diodotus but struck by Antimachus was also chanced upon. Scholars increasingly accepted the reasoning of Droysen and Cunningham proposed that Agathocles (alongside Antimachus) first ruled under Diodotus (Note: Diodotus I apparently had two daughters (and a son Diodotus II) who were married off to Agathocles and Antimachus. Thus, they served as "lieutenant kings".) and then under Euthydemus and Antiochus. The general understanding of Bactrian Kingdom around the middle nineteenth century hold all of these Kings to be contemporaneous co-rulers. Among the rare dissenting voices was Alfred von Sallet who asserted that these "ancestor coins" were struck for the purpose of commemoration and rejected that these rulers were contemporary, based on the design of coins.

Deities on the coinage of Agathokles
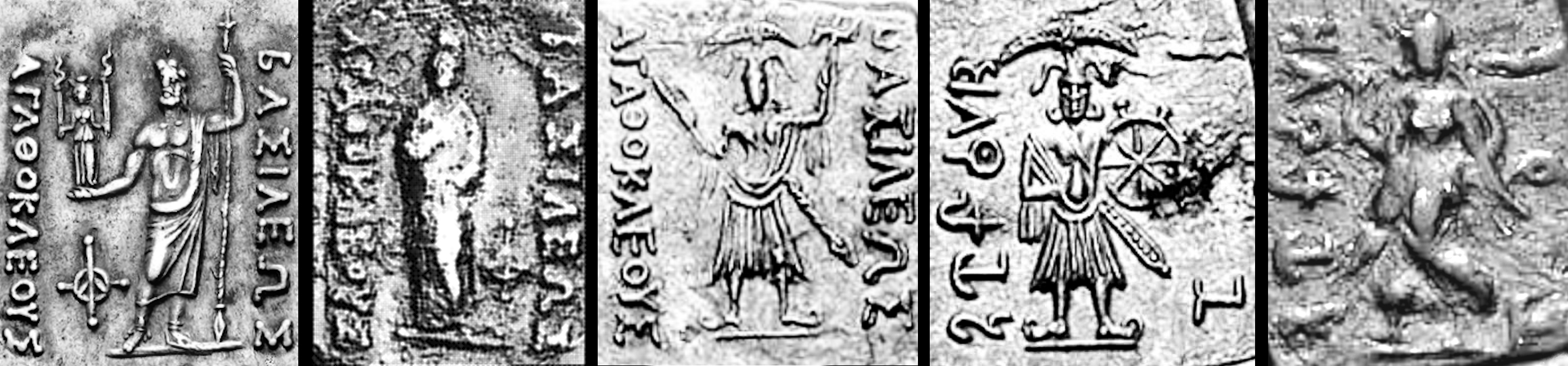
The coinage of Agathocles (c. 180 BCE) incorporated the Brahmi script and several deities from India, which have been variously interpreted as Vishnu, Shiva, Vāsudeva, Balarama or the Buddha.

1. Zeus standing with goddess Hecate. Greek: "King Agathokles".
2. Deity wearing a long himation with a volume on the head, arm partly bent, and contrapposto pose. Greek: "King Agathokles". This coin is in bronze.
3. Hindu god Balarama-Samkarshana with attributes. Greek: "King Agathokles".
4. Hindu god Vāsudeva-Krishna with attributes. Brahmi: "Rajane Agathukleyasa", "King Agathokles".

5. Goddess Lakshmi, holding a lotus in her right hand. Brahmi: "Rajane Agathukleyasa", "King Agathokles".

In 1880, a coin of the same kind struck by Agathocles but "commemorating" Alexander, Son of Philip, was published by Percy Garnder of British Museum. That it was impossible for Agathocles to be a sub-king of someone who had ruled about two hundred years earlier, Droysen's explanation was summarily rejected in favor of Sallet. (Note: Frank L. Holt emphasizes how not only the discoveries but their chronological order dictated the scholarly opinion.) Gardner proposed that these coins were struck to increase his public on the eve of an (eventually successful) challenge by Eucratides I. In the early-mid 1900, Hugh Rawinson and William Tarn would extrapolate Gardner's ideas to further their visions of a grand Hellenistic past where Agathocles had faked his pedigree and Eucratides I was carrying out the orders of Antiochus IV to reestablish the Seleucid control. Other scholars generally avoided giving too much significance to these "ancestor coins".

More varieties of these coins would be discovered later. These mention Diodotus II, Demetrius II and Demetrius. In the last few decades, such coins have been discovered in more numbers but the accuracy of these finds remain plagued by the fact that these did not came from controlled excavations but auction networks. They were evaluated by scholars only after they have traveled continents and passed through multiple hands.

It has been since accepted that these coins indeed represented Agathocles's predecessors. The precise context of minting and significance is still not clear.

=== Religious coinage ===
Agathocles was unique in issuing bilingual coinage. Meant for local circulation in Gandhara, they were typically of smaller denominations, square or rectangular in shape, and minted in bronze or silver. The obverse had his portrait labelled in Greek while the reverse had imagery from the Buddhist as well as Hindu pantheon alongside inscriptions in Brahmi/Kharosthi. (Note: These coins also served as Rosetta-stone equivalents for the deciphering of Brahmi script by colonial scholars.) Monolingual coinage (in Kharosthi) of similar kinds have been discovered.

These finds have led scholars to conclude that Agathocles favored socio-religious tolerance. Osmund Bopearachchi hold him to have inaugurated the first Indo-Greek era; others have been skeptic.

==== Buddhist ====
Buddhist symbols such as the stupa and the "tree in railing" have been located in his coins. These coins sometimes use Brahmi, and sometimes Kharoshthi, whereas later Indo-Greek kings only used Kharoshthi. Lakshmi, goddess of abundance and fortune, appears in several of these coins.

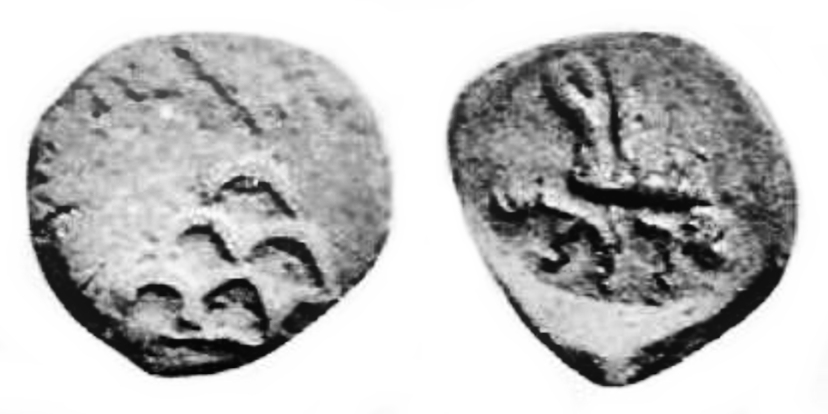
Buddhist coin of Agathocles, with stupa surmounted by a star, and vegetal symbol.

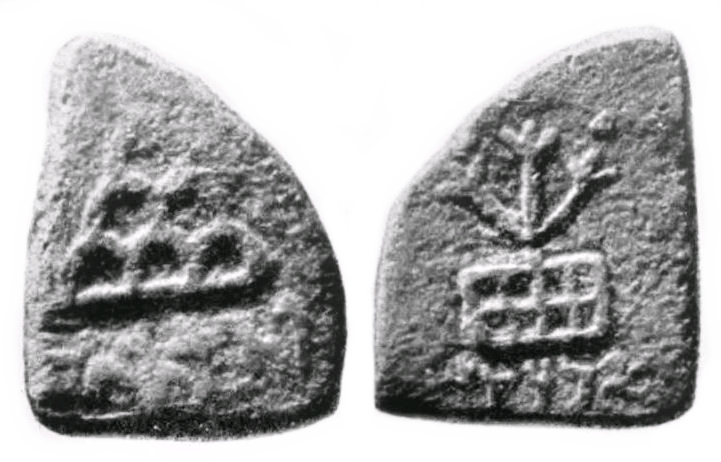
A six-arched hill symbol surmounted by a star. Kharoshthi legend Akathukreyasa "Agathocles". Tree-in-railing, Kharoshthi legend Hirañasame.

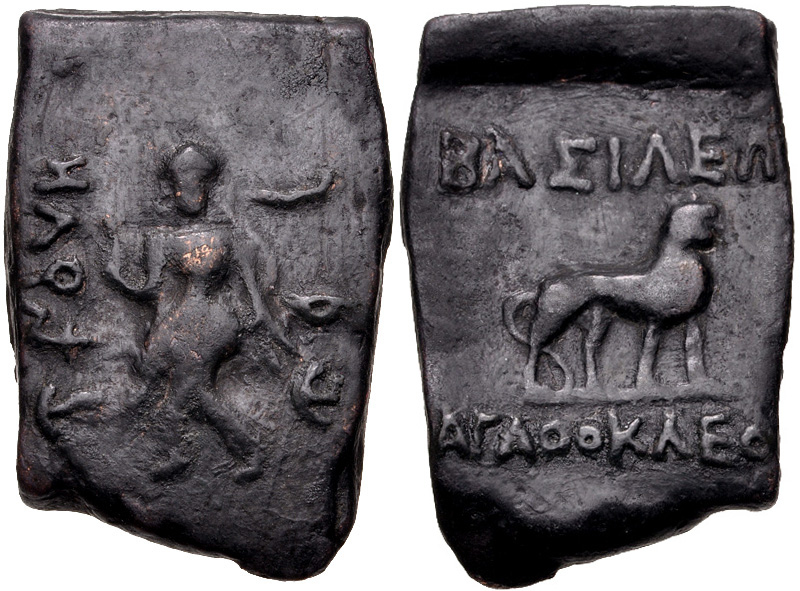
Agathokles coin Rajaye Agathukleya (Brahmi script).

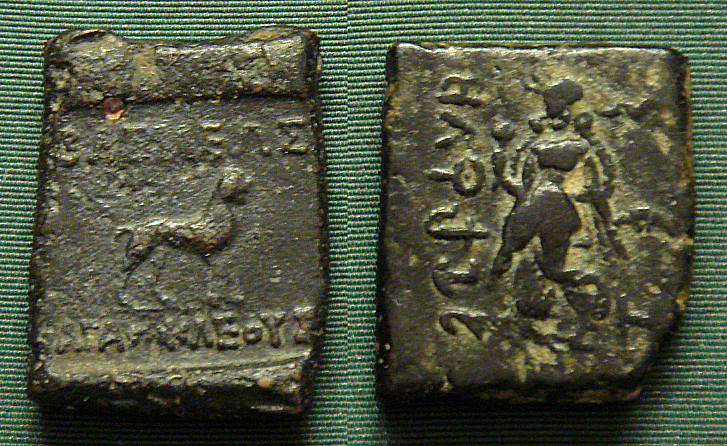
Indian coinage of Agathocles.
Obv Lion with Greek legend: ΒΑΣΙΛΕΩΣ ΑΓΑΘΟΚΛΕΟΥΣ.
Rev Lakshmi, with Brahmi legend Rajane Agathukleyasa "King Agathocles".

==== Hindu ====
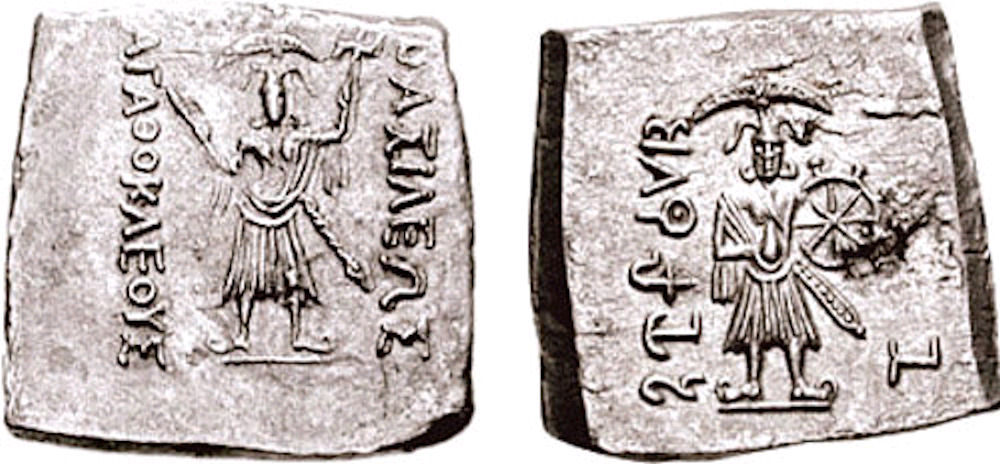
Coin of Agathocles Obv ΒΑΣΙΛΕΩΣ ΑΓΑΘΟΚΛΕΟΥΣ (Basileōs Agathokleous). Rev 𑀭𑀚𑀦𑁂 𑀅𑀕𑀣𑀼𑀼𑀓𑁆𑀮𑁂𑀬𑁂𑀲 Rajane Agathukleyesa "King Agathocles".

On 3 October 1970, six Indian-standard silver drachmas were discovered at the administrative quarters of Ai-Khanoum from a pilgrim's water vessel by a team of French archaeologists. These coins are the first numismatic representations of Vedic deities and serve as key evidences about Bhagavatism being the first form of Vaishnavism in early India.

The coins display early Avatars of Vishnu: Balarama-Sankarshana with attributes of pestle and plow on reverse, and Vāsudeva-Krishna with attributes of Shankha and Sudarshana Chakra on obverse. (Note: Bopearachchi notes that the attributes are contemporaneous to depictions in Indian literary canon.) On the bases of the coins bearing characteristic trademarks of Indian sculpture — frontal pose as opposed to three-quarter, stiff and starched folds in drapes, absence of proportions, and sideways disposition of feet — Audoin and Bernard speculated that the engravings were by Indian artists. Bopearachchi disputes the conclusion and points out the mis-representational depictions of Vāsudeva-Krishna's chattra with a headdress and conch with a high-necked vase; he hypothesizes that a Greek artist had engraved the coin from a now-lost (or undiscovered) sculpture.

A dancing girl, found on the obverse of some Bronze coins of Agathocles are believed to be representations of Subhadra.

=== Nickel coins ===
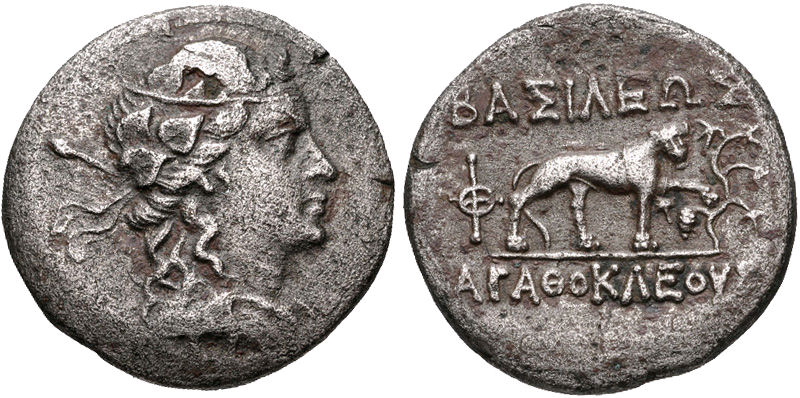
Agathocles's Cupro-nickel coin with Dionysos and panther with Greek legend ΒΑΣΙΛΕΩΣ ΑΓΑΘΟΚΛΕΟΥΣ. Notice the coin has a unique mottled appearance unlike silver coinage.

Also, Agathocles and Pantaleon, along with their contemporary Euthydemus II, are unique in the ancient world, in that they were the first in the world to issue copper-nickel (75/25 ratio) coins, an alloy technology only known by the Chinese at the time (some weapons from the Warring States period were in copper-nickel alloy). These coins used the symbolism of Dionysos with a thyrsus over his left shoulder and his panther, which were his type for smaller coinage.

It has long been suggested that the nickel contained in the coins of Agathocles was ultimately of Chinese origin (Chinese Baitong, 白铜, "white copper"), and that they were indicative of the existence of trade links with China around that time. However, a recent archaeometallurgical study of trace elements has shown that nickel in these coins actually came from natural nickeliferous copper ore.

=== Decipherment of the Brahmi script ===
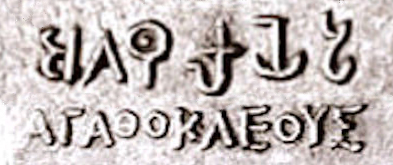
Identical regnal names Agathuklayesa (Brahmi: 𑀅𑀕𑀣𑀼𑀼𑀓𑁆𑀮𑁂𑀬𑁂𑀲) and Agathokleous (Greek: ΑΓΑΘΟΚΛΕΟΥΣ) on a bilingual coin of Agathocles, used by Christian Lassen to decipher securely the first Brahmi letters.

From 1834, some attempts were made to decipher the Brahmi script, the main script used in old Indian inscriptions such as the Edicts of Ashoka, and which had become extinct since the 5th century CE. Some attempts by Rev. J. Stevenson were made to identify characters from the Karla Caves (c. 1st century CE) based on their similarities with the Gupta script of the Samudragupta inscription of the Allahabad pillar (4th century CE) which had just been deciphered, but this led to a mix of good (about 1/3) and bad guesses, which did not permit proper decipherment of the Brahmi.

The first successful attempts at deciphering the ancient Brahmi script of the 3rd-2nd centuries BCE were made in 1836 by Norwegian scholar Christian Lassen, who used the bilingual Greek-Brahmi coins of Indo-Greek kings Agathocles and Pantaleon to correctly and securely identify several Brahmi letters. The task was then completed by James Prinsep, an archaeologist, philologist, and official of the East India Company, who was able to identify the rest of the Brahmi characters, with the help of Major Cunningham. In a series of results that he published in March 1838 Prinsep was able to translate the inscriptions on a large number of rock edicts found around India, and provide, according to Richard Salomon, a "virtually perfect" rendering of the full Brahmi alphabet.

== Gallery ==
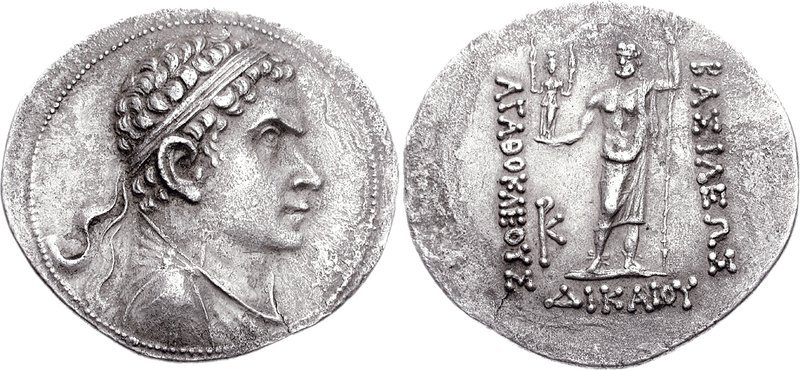
Silver coin of Agathocles. The obverse shows the king's portrait wearing a diadem. The reverse shows standing Zeus holding goddess Hecate and sceptre. Greek legend reads: ΒΑΣΙΛΕΩΣ ΔIKAIOY ΑΓΑΘΟΚΛΕΟΥΣ, Basileōs Dikaiou Agathokleous, "of King Agathocles the Just".

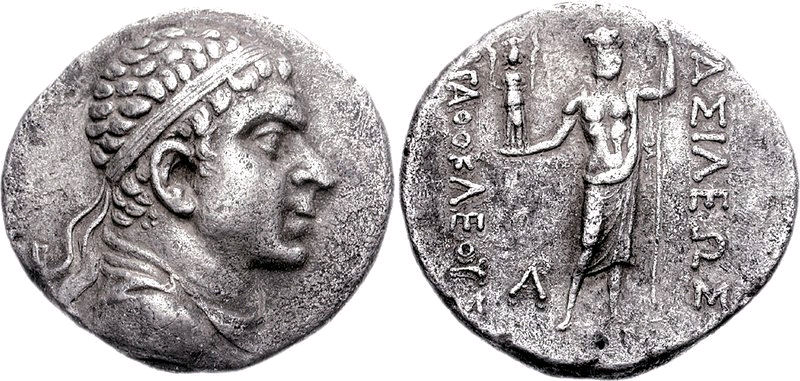
Another silver coin of king Agathocles. The obverse with the king's portrait wearing diadem and reverse with standing Zeus holding Hecate and sceptre.

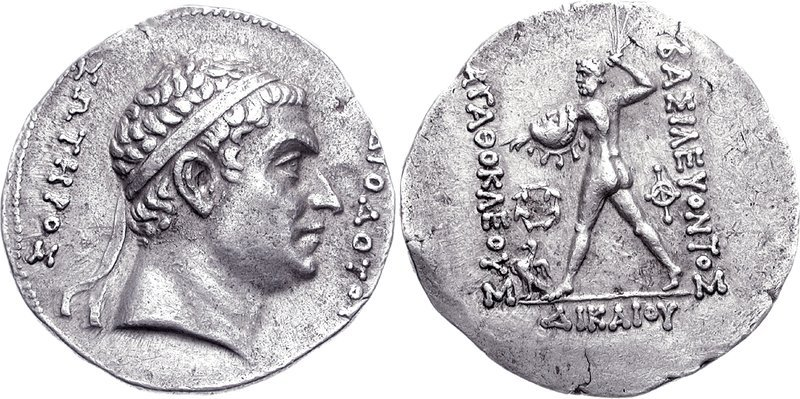
Another coin of Agathocles, commemorating Diodotus I Soter, with the Greek legend: ΔIOΔOTOY ΣΩTHPOΣ, "of Diodotus the Saviour". The reverse shows Zeus holding aegis and thunderbolt and advancing left.

== See also ==
- Indo-Greek Kingdom
- Greco-Buddhism
- Indo-Scythians

== Notes ==
Preceded by Demetrius I	Greco-Bactrian king (in Paropamisade); 190-180 BCE	Succeeded by Apollodotus I

	Greco-Bactrian kings		Indo-Greek kings					
Territories/ dates	West Bactria	East Bactria	Paropamisade	Arachosia	Gandhara	Western Punjab	Eastern Punjab	Mathura
326-325 BCE	Campaigns of Alexander the Great in India						Nanda Empire	
312 BCE	Creation of the Seleucid Empire						Creation of the Maurya Empire	
305 BCE	Seleucid Empire after Mauryan war		Maurya Empire					
280 BCE	Foundation of Ai-Khanoum							
255–239 BCE	Independence of the Greco-Bactrian kingdom Diodotus I		Emperor Ashoka (268-232 BCE)					
239–223 BCE	Diodotus II							
230–200 BCE	Euthydemus I							
200–190 BCE	Demetrius I				Sunga Empire			
190-185 BCE	Euthydemus II							
190–180 BCE	Agathocles			Pantaleon				
185–170 BCE	Antimachus I							
180–160 BCE			Apollodotus I					
175–170 BCE	Demetrius II							
160–155 BCE			Antimachus II					
170–145 BCE	Eucratides I							
155–130 BCE	Yuezhi occupation, loss of Ai-Khanoum	Eucratides II; Plato; Heliocles I	Menander I					
130–120 BCE	Yuezhi occupation		Zoilus I		Agathoclea			Yavanarajya inscription
120–110 BCE			Lysias		Strato I			Yavanarajya inscription
110–100 BCE			Antialcidas		Heliocles II			Yavanarajya inscription
100 BCE			Polyxenus		Demetrius III			Yavanarajya inscription
100–95 BCE			Philoxenus					Yavanarajya inscription
95–90 BCE			Diomedes	Amyntas		Epander		Yavanarajya inscription
90 BCE			Theophilus	Peucolaus		Thraso		Yavanarajya inscription
90–85 BCE			Nicias	Menander II		Artemidorus		Yavanarajya inscription
90–70 BCE			Hermaeus	Archebius				Yavanarajya inscription
			Yuezhi occupation		Maues (Indo-Scythian)			
75–70 BCE				Vonones	Telephus	Apollodotus II		
65–55 BCE				Spalirises		Hippostratus	Dionysius	
55–35 BCE					Azes I (Indo-Scythians)		Zoilus II	
55–35 BCE					Vijayamitra/ Azilises		Apollophanes	
25 BCE – 10 CE				Gondophares	Zeionises	Kharahostes	Strato II; Strato III	
				Gondophares (Indo-Parthian)			Rajuvula (Indo-Scythian)	
			Kujula Kadphises (Kushan Empire)				Bhadayasa (Indo-Scythian)	Sodasa (Indo-Scythian)
