= Siege of Bactra =

207 BCE siege

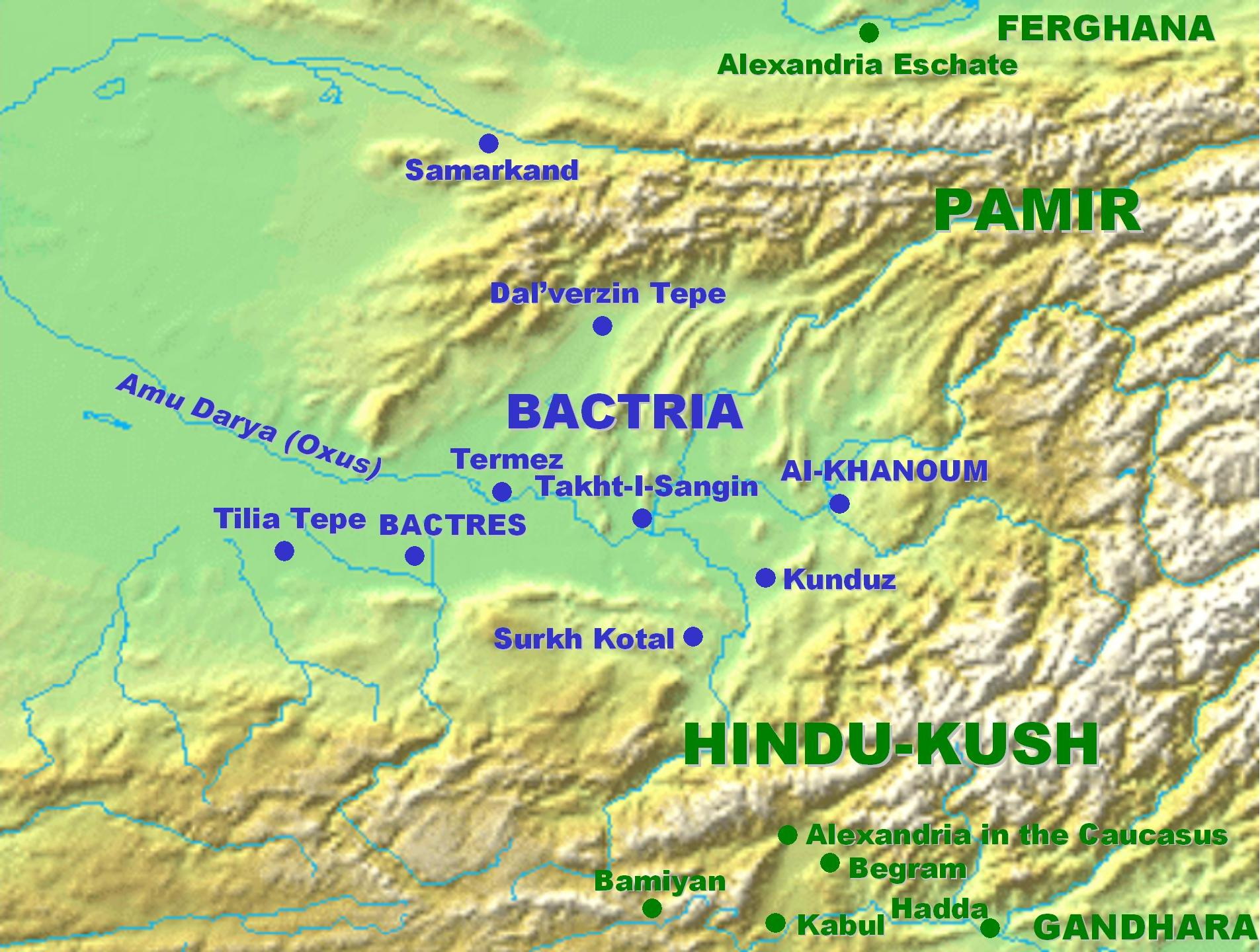
- Map showing Balkh (here indicated as Bactres), the capital of Bactria
Date	208–206 BC
Location	Bactra (Modern day Balkh, Afghanistan)
Result	Seleucid victory: Antiochus signs a peace treaty with Euthydemus; Antiochus III recognizes Euthydemus's reign

Belligerents
Seleucid Empire	Greco-Bactrian Kingdom

Commanders and leaders
Antiochus III the Great	Euthydemus I

The siege of Bactra was the unsuccessful siege of the city of Bactra, the capital of Bactria, by Antiochus III, ruler of the Seleucid Empire, that lasted from 208 to 206 BC in the Hellenistic period. With no end in sight and concerned about the danger posed by his prolonged absence from his empire, he concluded a peace treaty with Euthydemus I.

Antiochus invaded Bactria in 208 BC and defeated Euthydemus and the Greco-Bactrians at the Battle of the Arius that same year. Euthydemus retreated to Bactra.

After two years' laying siege to Bactra, Antiochus' fortunes to the west of his empire had deteriorated to the point where he decided to lift the siege. Euthydemus then sent his son and heir, Demetrius, as his representative to negotiate a peace treaty. Impressed at Demetrius' behaviour and bearing which was seen as worthy of that of a member of the royalty, Antiochus offered him one of his daughters and agreed to a peace treaty. negotiate a peace treaty with Euthydemus. It was agreed that Antiochus would recognize Euthydemus as a king and ally, and he gave one of his daughters as a wife to Demetrius. As a part of the treaty, Euthydemus gave Antiochus war elephants which Antiochus, along with his own, may have used at the Battle of Magnesia.
