= Antiochus Nicator =

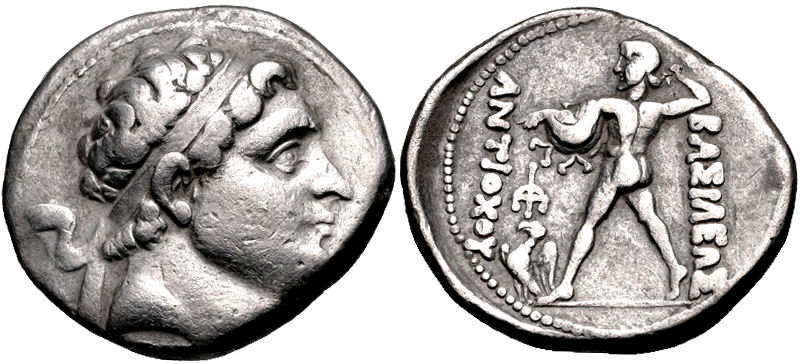
Bactrian coin bearing the Greek legend ΒΑΣΙΛΕΩΣ ΑΝΤΙΟΧΟΥ - "Of king Antiochos".

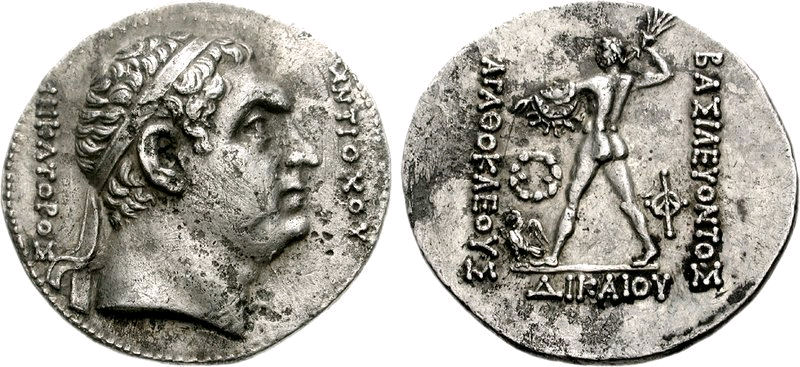
Commemorative coin struck by Agathocles (ca. 185 BC-175 BC), bearing the legend ΑΝΤΙΟΧΟΥ ΝΙΚΑΤΟΡΟΣ "Of Antiochus Nikator"

Antiochus Nicator (Greek: Ἀντίοχος Νικάτωρ; "Antiochus the Victor") is a proposed Greco-Bactrian king of the Diodotid dynasty, who ruled for some period between 240 – 220 BC, who might have been a younger son of Diodotus I. His existence is controversial.

== Issue and interpretations ==
There are two relevant sets of coins:

1. A set of Bactrian coins, similar to those minted in the name of Diodotus, bear the legend Ancient Greek: ΒΑΣΙΛΕΩΣ ΑΝΤΙΟΧΟΥ "Of King Antiochus." The obverse portrait resembles that of Diodotus I and the reverse is the same as on other Diodotid coins: Zeus hurling a thunderbolt, with an eagle on the side.
2. The later Bactrian king Agathocles honoured several earlier rulers of Bactria with commemorative coins. One of these commemorative issues appears to be modelled on the aforementioned series and labels the honoree as ΑΝΤΙΟΧΟΥ ΝΙΚΑΤΟΡΟΣ "Antiochus Nikator."

The usual interpretation is that the former issue were semi-independent issues of the first Bactrian king Diodotus I, who would have struck coinage using the name of his former overlord, the Seleucid king Antiochus II, but with his own portrait, at the start of a slow drift into independence from the Seleucid empire. The commemorative issue is traditionally interpreted as commemorating the Seleucid king Antiochus I or Antiochus II, although neither of them bore the epithet Nikator ("Victor").

In 2010, Jens Jakobsson proposed that these coins were struck by a Bactrian king who himself was called Antiochos. This king might have been a brother or a younger son of Diodotus I, ruling either as a co-regent or after the death of the first Diodotus' successor and son Diodotus II. The (very few) ancient literary sources are ambiguous: they mention no king between Diodotus II and Euthydemus I, but do not exclude the possibility. In a 2021 article, Jakobssen reiterated his earlier argument, further noting a number of features that suggest that the "Of King Antiochus" coins were minted after those of Diodotus I and II and immediately before those of Euthydemus I:

1. The "Of King Antiochus" coins have similar portraits and share a number of mint mark monograms with the Euthydemus coinage, but have no such connections with the coinage of king Antiochus II in his own name.
2. In a hoard of coins from Ai Khanoum, the coins in the name of Diodotus are more worn than the coins "Of King Antiochus" - implying that the former were older than the latter.
3. There is a die link between the obverse of the gold staters "Of King Antiochus" and the gold staters of King Euthydemus.

The matter remains uncertain. Simon Glenn mentions the issue as an as-yet unresolved issue in Bactrian numismatics, but has called the die link "solid numismatic evidence" and the existence of Antiochus Nicator "most likely." By contrast, Olivier Bordeaux calls Jakobsson's proposal "somewhat controversial" and to be treated "with great caution."

== Bibliography ==
- Bopearachchi, Osmund (1991). Monnaies Gréco-Bactriennes et Indo-Grecques, Catalogue Raisonné. Paris: Bibliothèque Nationale de France. ISBN 2-7177-1825-7.
- Bordeaux, Olivier (2021). "Monetary Policies during the early Graeco-Bactrian Kingdom (250-190 BC)". In Mairs, Rachel (ed.). The Graeco-Bactrian and Indo-Greek world. Abingdon, Oxon. pp. 510–519. ISBN 9781138090699.
- Glenn, Simon (2020). Money and Power in Hellenistic Bactria: Euthydemus I to Antimachus I. New York: American Numismatic Society. ISBN 978-0897223614.
- Glenn, Simon (2021). "History from Coins: The Role of Numismatics in the Study of the Graeco-Bactrian and Indo-Greek Worlds". In Mairs, Rachel (ed.). The Graeco-Bactrian and Indo-Greek world. Abingdon, Oxon. pp. 467–498. ISBN 9781138090699.
- Holt, Frank L. (1999). Thundering Zeus: The Making of Hellenistic Bactria. Berkeley, CA: University of California Press. ISBN 0520211405.
- Jakobsson, Jens (2010). "Antiochus Nicator, a third king of Hellenistic Bactria?". Numismatic Chronicle. 170: 17–33.
- Jakobsson, Jens (2021). "Dating Bactria's Independence to 246/5 BC?". In Mairs, Rachel (ed.). The Graeco-Bactrian and Indo-Greek world. Abingdon, Oxon. pp. 499–509. ISBN 9781138090699.
- Zeng, C. (2013). "Some Notable Die-Links among Bactrian Gold Staters". Numismatic Chronicle. 173: 73–78.

Preceded by Diodotus II	Greco-Bactrian Ruler?	Succeeded by Euthydemus I
