= Diodotus I =

First Greek king of Bactria

- Basileus
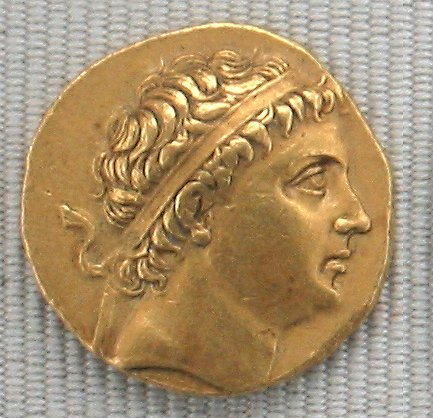
- Gold coin of Diodotus c. 245 BC. The reverse legend reads: "ΒΑΣΙΛΕΩΣ ΔΙΟΔΟΤΟΥ" – "(of) King Diodotos". Cabinet des Medailles, Paris.

King of Bactria
- Reign: c. 255 – c. 235 BCE
- Predecessor: Position Established
- Successor: Diodotus II
- Born: c. 300 BC
- Died: c. 235 BC; Bactria
- Spouse: Daughter of Antiochus II and Laodice I ?
- Issue: Diodotus II
- Dynasty: Diodotid

Diodotus I Soter (Greek: Διόδοτος Σωτήρ, Diódotos Sōtḗr, "Diodotos the Savior"; c. 300 BC – c. 235 BC) was the first Hellenistic king of Bactria. Diodotus was initially satrap of Bactria, but became independent of the Seleucid empire around 255 BC, establishing the Greco-Bactrian Kingdom. In about 250 BC, Diodotus repelled a Parthian invasion of Bactria by Arsaces. He minted an extensive coinage and administered a powerful and prosperous new kingdom. He died around 235 BC and was succeeded by his son Diodotus II.

His rule was recounted by Apollodorus of Artemita in the Parthian History, but this text is lost, and surviving literary sources only mention him in passing. Thus, most details of Diodotus's life have to be reconstructed from numismatics and brief references by Justin and other historians.

== Background and satrapy ==
The region of Bactria, which encompassed the Oxus river Valley in modern Afghanistan and Tajikistan, was conquered by Alexander between 329 and 327 BC and he settled a number of his veterans in the region. In the wars which followed Alexander's death in 323 BC, the region was largely left to its own devices, but it was incorporated in the Seleucid empire by Seleucus I between 308 and 305 BC, along with the rest of the territories that Alexander had conquered in Iran and Central Asia. Seleucus entrusted the region to his son and co-regent, Antiochus I, around 295 BC. Between 295 and 281 BC, Antiochus I established firm Seleucid control over the region. The region was divided into a number of satrapies (provinces), of which Bactria was one. Antiochus founded or refounded a number of cities on the Greek model in the region and he opened a number of mints to produce coinage on the Attic weight standard. After Antiochus I succeeded his father as ruler of the Seleucid empire in 281 BC, he entrusted the east to his own son, Antiochus II, who remained in this position until he in turn succeeded to the throne in 261 BC.

Diodotus became Seleucid satrap of Bactria during Antiochus II's reign. The nature of the Bactrian satrapy, traditionally assigned to an Achaemenid Crown Prince, suggests Diodotus's prominence. According to some scholars, he may have later married a daughter of Antiochus II (as his second marriage); although this is uncertain and Tarn's genealogical assertions are controversial. The Babylonian Astronomical Diaries record that an unnamed Bactrian satrap sent a herd of twenty war elephants to Babylon at the beginning of 273 BC to join the Seleucid forces fighting against Ptolemaic Egypt in the First Syrian War. This satrap may have been Diodotus, or a predecessor. Archaeological evidence for the period comes largely from excavations of the city of Ai-Khanoum, where this period saw the expansion of irrigation networks, the construction and expansion of civic buildings, and some military activity, probably raiding by nomads from the Central Asian steppe. As satrap, Diodotus was probably involved in these matters, though the specifics are not recoverable.

== Secession from the Seleucid realm ==
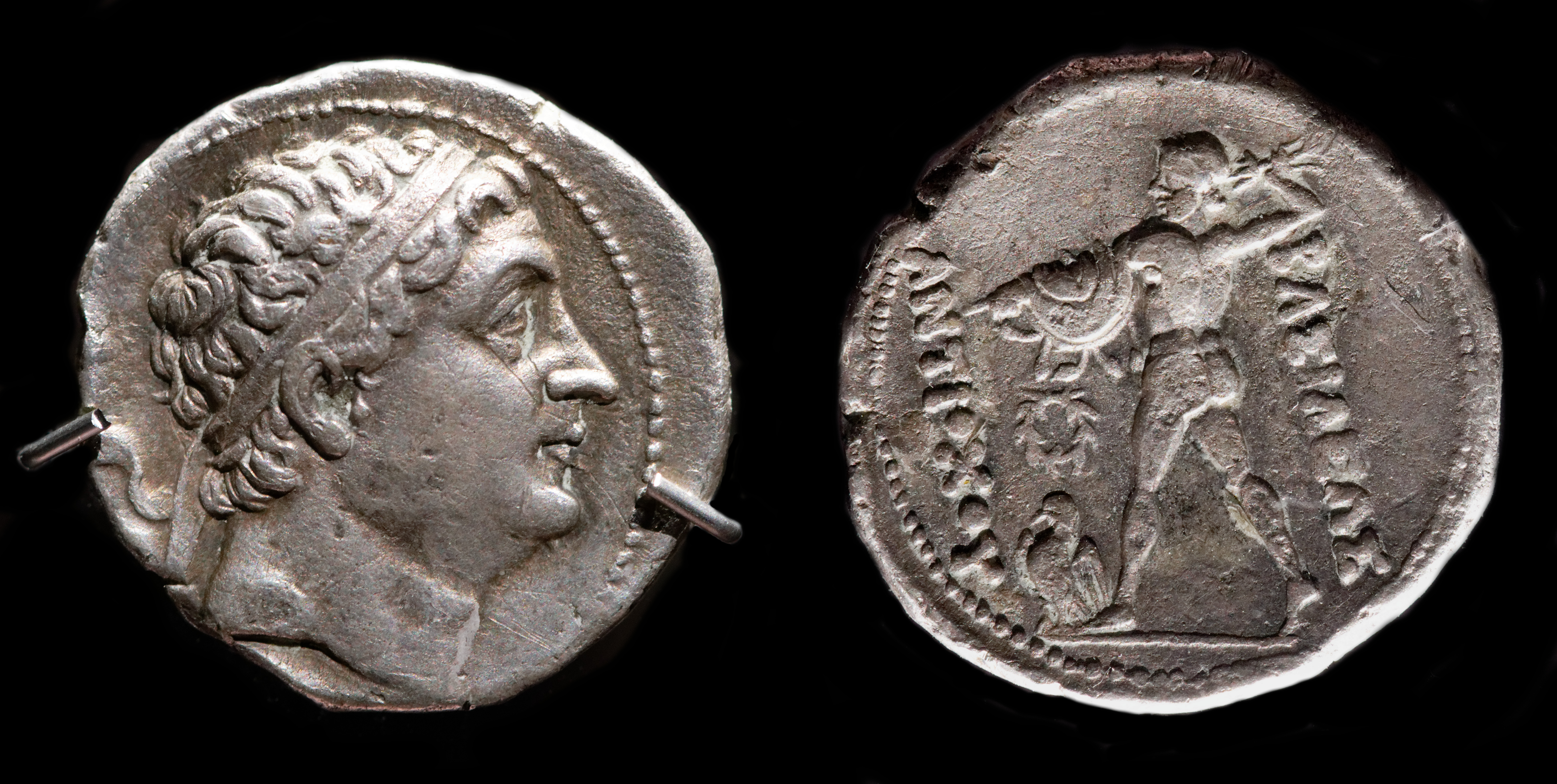
Tetradrachm of Diodotus I of Bactria, 250–240 BC. Obverse: diademed bust right. Reverse: nude Zeus standing left, holding aegis over his outstretched left arm and hurling thunderbolt with his right hand, eagle in the field, ΒΑΣΙΛΕΩΣ ΑΝΤΙΟΧΟΥ ('of King Antiochus'). From Shahr-i-Nau, Hisor District, Tajikistan. National Museum of Antiquities of Tajikistan.

At some point, Diodotus seceded from the Seleucid empire, establishing his realm as an independent kingdom, known in modern scholarship as the Graeco-Bactrian kingdom. The event is mentioned briefly by the Roman historian Justin:

Diodotus, the governor of the thousand cities of Bactria, defected and proclaimed himself king; all the other people of the Orient followed his example and seceded from the Macedonians [i.e. the Seleucids].

— Justin Epitome of Pompeius Trogus 41.4

The date of this event is unclear. The literary evidence is as follows:

- Justin says that the rebellion occurred 'around the same time' as the Parni conquest of Parthia from the Seleucid realm, but his dating of this event is confused—he places it in 256 BC, but during the reign of Seleucus II (246-225 BC).
- Strabo further claims that Arsaces, the leader of the Parni, had been based in Bactria before the conquest. He says that Diodotus drove Arsaces out of Bactria and maintained hostilities against the Parni.
- Ammianus Marcellinus places the Parthian rebellion in the reign of a Seleucus (II?).
- Arrian's lost Parthian History seems to have claimed that the Seleucid satrap who was overthrown by the Parthians was appointed to that position by Antiochus II.
- Appian states that the Parthian rebellion took place in 246 BC, during the Third Syrian War, in the wake of Ptolemy III's conquest of Seleucid Syria and Babylon. The Adulis inscription set up by Ptolemy III to celebrate this event claims that Bactria was among Ptolemy's conquests, which is hyperbole but might indicate that Bactria had been part of the Seleucid empire up to this point.

Different scholars have argued for a 'High Chronology' which places Diodotus's independence around 255 BC in the reign of Antiochus II, or a 'Low Chronology' which dates the secession around 245 BC at the beginning of the reign of Seleucus II. Several scholars have expressed pessimism about the possibility of resolving this debate with the available evidence. Frank Holt argues that the secession should be seen as a gradual process in which Diodotus and other eastern Seleucid satraps aggregated ever more autonomy, rather than a single event. In his opinion, the process probably began in the 250s BC and was completed in the reign of Seleucus II. By contrast, Jens Jakobssen argues that Diodotus assumed independence suddenly in 246 or 245 BC, in the confusion of the Third Syrian War, during which it briefly appeared that Ptolemy III had conquered the Seleucid core territories of Syria and Mesopotamia.

The limited archaeological evidence reveals no signs of discontinuity or destruction in this period. The transition from Seleucid rule to independence thus seems to have been accomplished peacefully. Coins of Antiochus I were over sixty times more common than those of Antiochus II in the excavations at Ai Khanoum, which might indicate that Bactria shifted out of the Seleucid orbit early in Antiochus II's reign, or that Antiochus I's coinage continued to be minted posthumously.

Possible Bactrian satrapal capitals
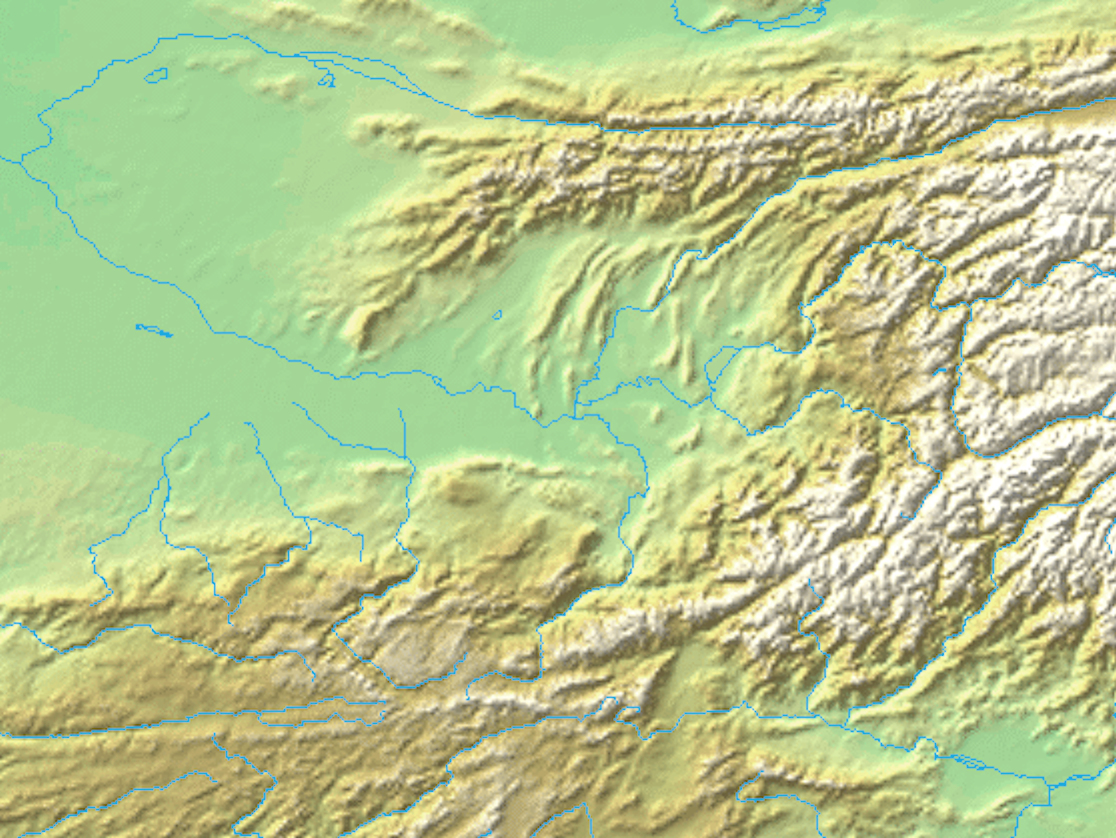

Whether gradual or quick, the culmination of the process was apparently Diodotus's proclamation of himself as king. He divided the territories under his control into a number of satrapies, each with its own satrap. Two of these satrapies, Aspionus and Turiva (perhaps Tapuria) were established on the border with Parthia. Archaeologists have identified a number of other settlements which might be other satrapal capitals, including Yemshi Tepe in Sar-e Pol, Dalverzin Tepe in the Surxondaryo river valley, and Kobadian in the Kofarnihon river valley. It is unclear whether Diodotus based himself and his main mint at Ai-Khanoum or Bactra.

The literary sources stress the prosperity of the new kingdom. Justin calls it "the extremely prosperous empire of the thousand cities of Bactria.", while the geographer Strabo says:

The Greeks who caused Bactria to revolt grew so powerful on account of the fertility of the country that they became masters, not only of Ariana, but also of India, as Apollodorus of Artemita says: and more tribes were subdued by them than by Alexander... Their cities were Bactra (also called Zariaspa, through which flows a river bearing the same name and emptying into the Oxus), and Darapsa, and several others.

— Strabo Geography 11.11.1

Diodotus continued to be hostile to the Parthians for the rest of his reign. Justin emphasises Arsaces's precarious position, opposed by the Seleucids to his west and Diodotus to the east—he is unclear about whether this opposition was co-ordinated. Before archaeological evidence became available, it was generally assumed that the Parni conquest of Parthia had decisively cut Bactria off from contact with Seleucid authority and Greek culture.However, archaeological evidence makes clear that goods and people continued to move between Bactria and the Seleucid realm.

Diodotus died during the reign of Seleucus II, sometime around 235 BC, probably of natural causes. He was succeeded by his son Diodotus II. The new king concluded a peace with the Parthians and supported Arsaces when Seleucus II attacked him around 228 BC. Diodotus II was subsequently killed by an usurper, Euthydemus, who founded the Euthydemid dynasty.

== Coinage ==
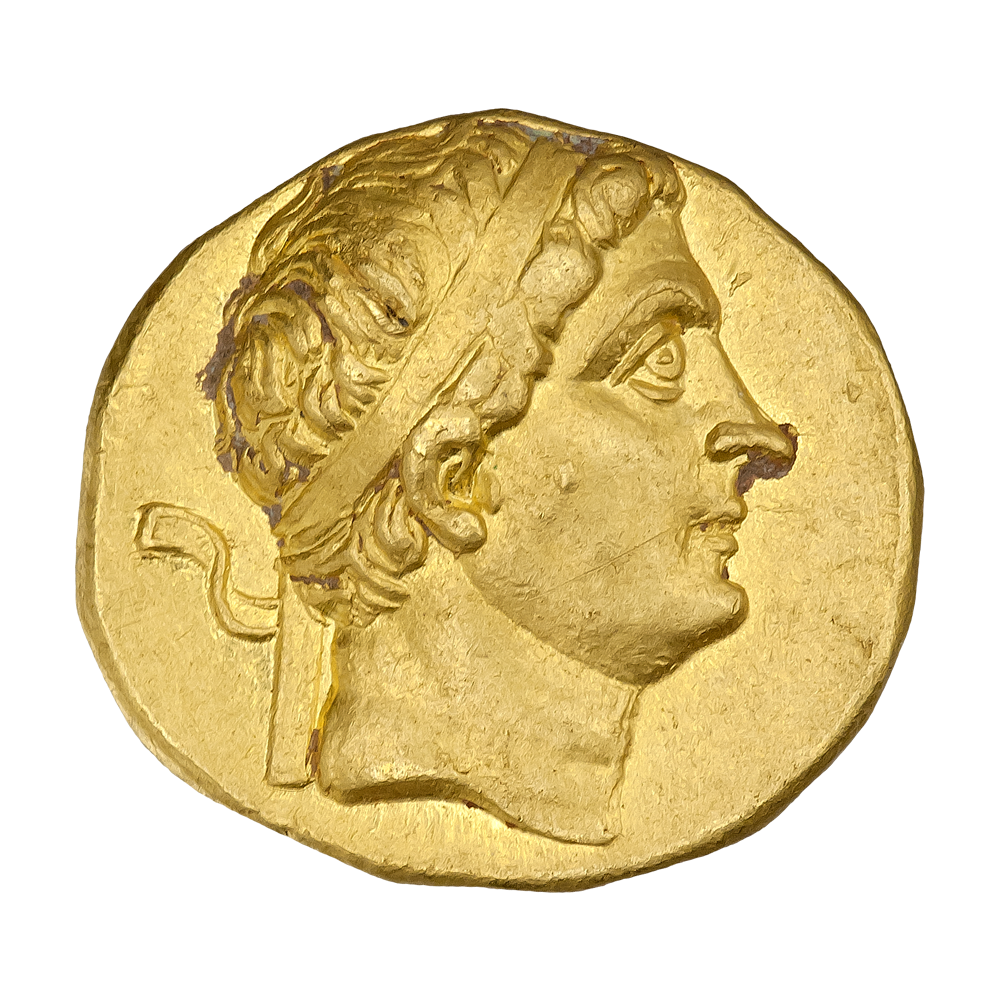
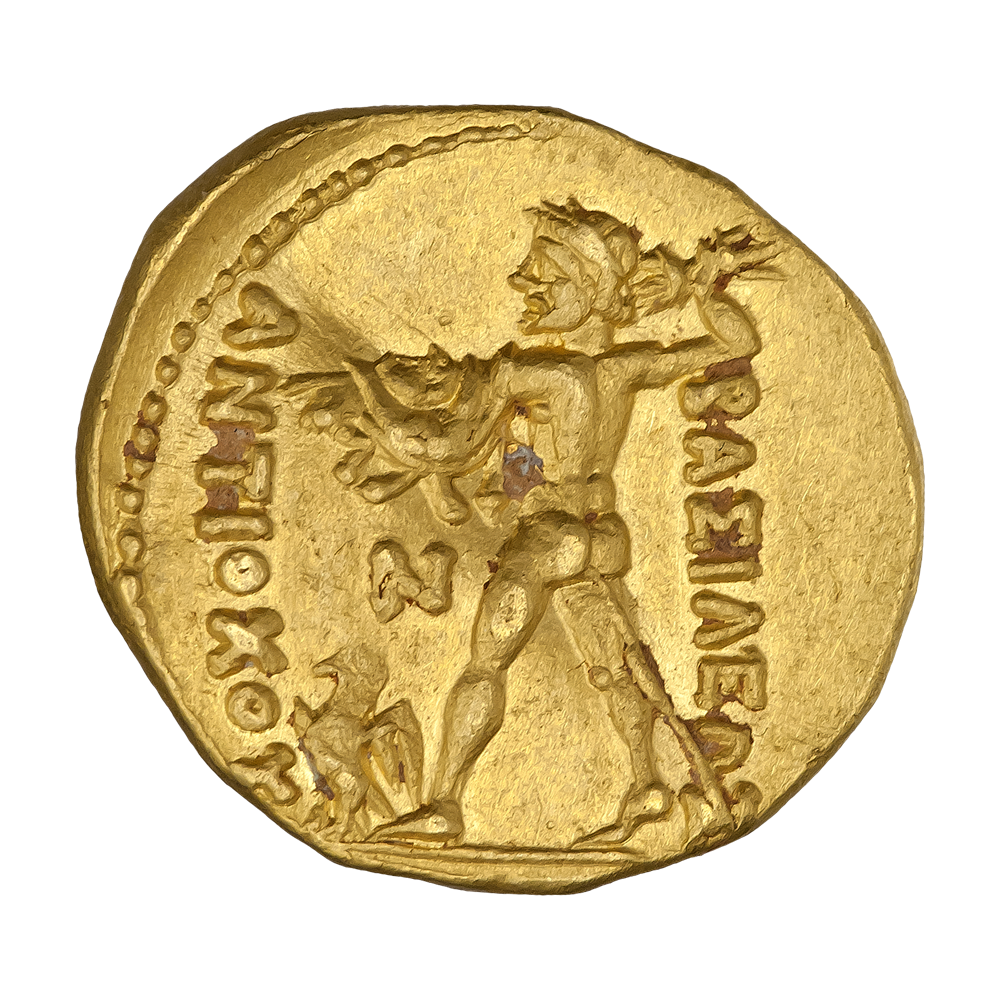
Gold Stater of Diodotus I from 'Series A', issue 7. Obverse: Diademed head of Diodotos I, facing right. Reverse: Zeus advancing left, holding thunderbolt in right hand, aegis draped over extended left arm, Ν control-mark at left, eagle at his feet standing left, Ancient Greek: ΒΑΣΙΛΕΩΣ ΑΝΤΙΟΧΟΥ ('Of King Antiochus')

Before Diodotus came to power, there was already a mint in Bactria based at Ai-Khanoum or at Bactra, which minted royal coinage in the name of the Seleucid sovereign, with the reigning Seleucid king's portrait on the obverse and an image of Apollo, the Seleucid patron deity, sitting on an omphalus. As satrap, Diodotus continued to issue these coins, in the name of Antiochus II. This included gold staters, silver tetradrachms, drachms, and hemidrachms, and some bronze coins. None of them seem to have been issued in great quantity.

On Frank Holt's interpretation, Diodotus introduced a new coinage while still satrap, which consisted of a large number of silver tetradrachms and, later, a small number of gold staters. These coins have the head of a male figure on the obverse, presumably Diodotus himself, shown wearing the diadem—a band of cloth wrapped around the head, with two strips hanging down the back, which had been the standard symbol of Hellenistic kingship since the time of Alexander the Great. The image seems to gradually age over time, suggesting that it was intended as a realistic portrait of Diodotus. The reverse of these coins abandoned the Seleucid god Apollo in favour of a depiction of Zeus preparing to throw his thunderbolt. The choice of Zeus may have been intended as a reference to Diodotus himself whose name meant 'Gift of Zeus' in Greek. Alternatively, it may look back to early coinage struck by Seleucus I, from which the reverse image is taken. The legend on the reverse of these coins still reads Ancient Greek: ΒΑΣΙΛΕΩΣ ΑΝΤΙΟΧΟΥ ('Of King Antiochus'). The coinage thus clearly proclaimed Diodotus's authority, but retained some ambiguity about the extent of his independence from the Seleucids. An alternative interpretation advanced by Jens Jakobsson is that this is the coinage of a separate king Antiochus Nicator, whom he interprets as a younger son of grandson of Diodotus, and whose rule he would place around the 220s BC.

Towards the end of this series, a small wreath appears on the reverse to the left of Zeus. The wreath was a Greek symbol of victory. Frank Holt suggests that it commemorated a victory over the Parthians and that this victory was also the source of Diodotus's epithet soter (savour). Other Hellenistic kings, such as Antiochus I Soter and Attalus I Soter of Pergamum took this title to commemorate victories over existential barbarian threats. Diodotus may have done the same. This may further have been the occasion of Diodotus I's assumption of the royal title of king (basileus)—as a similar victory was for Attalus I.

The date at which this coinage began is not clear. Frank Holt suggests it was around 250 BC. The coinage seems to have been minted simultaneously at two mints—one with a more aged portrait ('Series A') and the other with a younger portrait ('Series C and E'). The mint of 'Series A & C' is generally identified with the Ai-Khanoum/Bactra mint, that of 'Series E' has not been localised. Holt proposes that the younger portrait depicts Diodotus II, perhaps junior co-regent with Diodotus I. After a break, both mints produce coins with the younger portrait and with the legend now reading Ancient Greek: ΔΙΟΔΟΤΟΥ ('Of Diodotus', Series D and F). Holt suggests that this break marks the death of Diodotus I and accession of Diodotus II.

A few tetradrachm coins depicting Diodotus I in a more 'idealising' guise were issued late in Diodotus II's reign ('Series B'). Diodotus appears also on coins struck in his memory by the later Graeco-Bactrian kings Agathocles and Antimachus. These coins imitate the original design of the tetradrachms issued by Diodotus I, but with a legend on the obverse identifying the king as Ancient Greek: ΔΙΟΔΟΤΟΥ ΣΩΤΗΡΟΣ ('Of Diodotus Soter').

Diodotus also issued a bronze coinage ('Series G'). This coinage consisted of two denominations: a 'double' (c. 8.4 grammes, 20-24 millimetres in diameter) and a 'single' (4.2 g, 14–18 mm)—possibly worth 1/48 of a silver drachm. All denominations bore the head of Hermes wearing a petasus hat on the obverse, and two caducei (winged staffs, an attribute of Hermes) crossing one another on the reverse, with a legend reading Ancient Greek: ΒΑΣΙΛΕΩΣ ΑΝΤΙΟΧΟΥ ('Of King Antiochus'). There is a similar break to the silver and gold coins, after which the bronzes are issued with the legend Ancient Greek: ΔΙΟΔΟΤΟΥ ('Of Diodotus', 'Series H'). These bronze coins were found in very large numbers in the excavations of Ai-Khanoum.

== Issue ==
The only attested relative of Diodotus I is his son and successor, Diodotus II Theos. A younger son may have been Antiochus I Nicator. Tarn interpreted later Bactrian coinage as indicating that Diodotus had a daughter who married Euthydemus I, and was involved in the assassination of Diodotus and usurpation of the throne; then became Queen regent until her son Demetrius I ascended to the throne. There is no explicit evidence for this daughter's existence and the speculative nature of Tarn's genealogical reconstructions has been criticised in subsequent scholarship. For the illustration of these relationships, see Family tree of the Greco-Bactrian and Indo-Greek kings (at the Diodotids).

== Bibliography ==
- Bopearachchi, O. (2005). "La politique monétaire de la Bactriane sous les Séleucides". In Chankowski, V.; Duyrat, Frédérique (eds.). Le roi et l'économie: autonomies locales et structures royales dans l'économie de l'empire séleucide : actes des rencontres de Lille, 23 juin 2003, et d'Orléans, 29-30 janvier 2004. Vol. 6. pp. 349–69.
- Holt, Frank L. (1999). Thundering Zeus: The Making of Hellenistic Bactria. Berkeley, CA: University of California Press. ISBN 0520211405.
- Jakobsson, Jens (2021). "Dating Bactria's Independence to 246/5 BC?". In Mairs, Rachel (ed.). The Graeco-Bactrian and Indo-Greek world. Abingdon, Oxon. pp. 499–509. ISBN 9781138090699.
- Jakobsson, Jens (2010). "Antiochus Nicator, a third king of Hellenistic Bactria?". Numismatic Chronicle. 170: 17–33.
- Kritt, Brian (2001). Dynastic Transitions in the Coinage of Bactria. Lancaster: CNG.
- Lerner, Jeffrey D. (1999). The impact of Seleucid decline on the eastern Iranian plateau : the foundations of Arsacid Parthia and Graeco-Bactria. Stuttgart: Steiner. ISBN 3515074171.
- Musti, Domenico (1986). "The Date of the Secession of Parthia from the Seleucid Kingdom". In Walbank, F. W.; Astin, A. E.; Frederiksen, M. W.; Ogilvie, R. M. (eds.). The Cambridge Ancient History: Volume 7, Part 1: The Hellenistic World. Cambridge: Cambridge University Press. pp. 220–221. ISBN 9781139054348.
- Tarn, William Woodthorpe (1938). The Greeks in Bactria and India. Cambridge University Press. ISBN 9781108009416.

Preceded by Antiochus II (Seleucid Empire)	Greco-Bactrian Ruler c. 255 – c. 235 BC	Succeeded by Diodotus II
