= Frank Holt =

American archaeologist and author

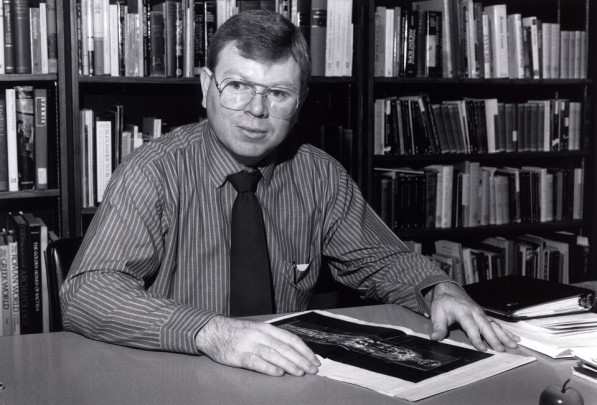
Frank Holt

Frank Lee Holt is an American archaeologist and author focusing on Central Asia. He is an Associate Professor of History at the University of Houston, and is recognized as one of the leading authorities on Alexander the Great, Hellenistic Asia, and numismatics. Holt received his PhD in History from the University of Virginia.

Holt has written five books and almost fifty articles, primarily concerning Alexander the Great and the Hellenization of Afghanistan.

== Books ==
- Alexander the Great and Bactria: The Formation of a Greek Frontier in Central Asia (published in 1989)
- Alexander the Great and the Mystery of the Elephant Medallions' (published in 2003)
- Thundering Zeus (published in 2005)
- Into the Land of Bones (published in 2006)
- The Treasures of Alexander the Great: How One Man's Wealth Shaped the World (published in 2016)
