= Antimachus I =

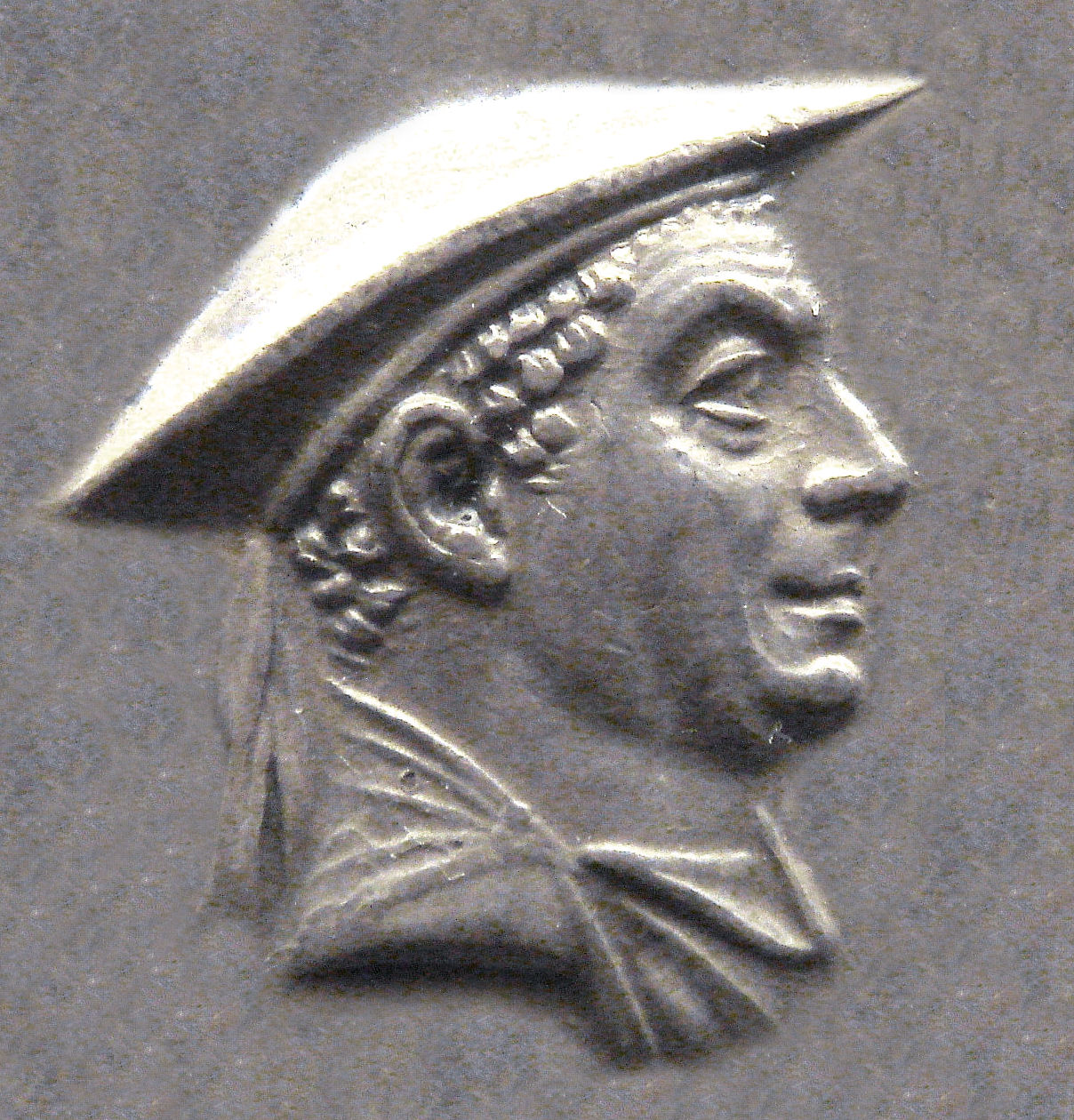
- Portrait of Antimachus I.

Greco-Bactrian king
- Reign: 171–160 BCE
- Predecessor: Euthydemus II
- Successor: Antimachus II

Antimachus I Theos (Ancient Greek: Ἀντίμαχος ὁ Θεός, Antímachos ho Theós, meaning "Antimachus the God"), known as Antimakha in Indian sources, was one of the Greco-Bactrian kings, generally dated from around 185 BC to 170 BC.

== Rule ==
William Woodthorpe Tarn and numismatist Robert Senior place Antimachus as a member of the Euthydemid dynasty and probably as a son of Euthydemus and brother of Demetrius. Other historians, like A. K. Narain, mark him as independent of Euthydemid authority, and probably a scion of some relation to the Diodotid dynasty. He was king of an area covering parts of Bactria and probably also Arachosia in southern Afghanistan (see "Coins of Antimachus I," below). Antimachus I was either defeated during his resistance to the usurper Eucratides, or his main territory was absorbed by the latter upon his death.

A unique tax receipt written on skin has been discovered from Bactria and apparently adds to the argument against direct Euthydemid familial connections. The document states:

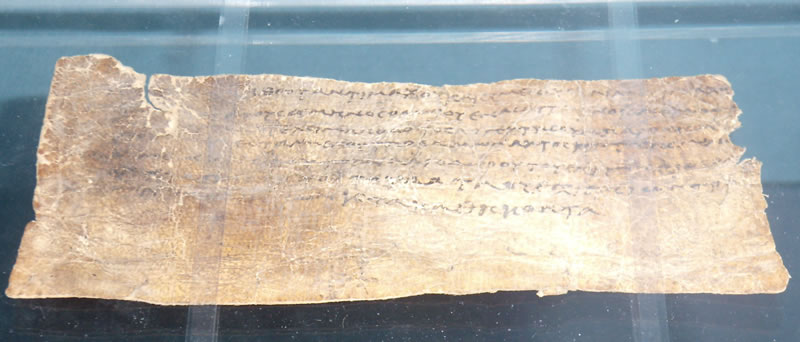
The tax receipt, Oxford, Ashmolean Museum.

βασιλευόντων θεοῦ Ἀντιμάχου καὶ Εὐμένους καὶ Ἀντιμάχου ... ἔτους δʼ, μηνὸς Ὀλώιου, ἐν Ἀσαγγώρνοις, νομοφυλακοῦντος... ἔχει Μηνόδοτος λογευτής, συμπαρόντων... τοῦ συναπεσταλμένου ὑπὸ Δημώνακτος ... τοῦ γενομένου... καὶ Σίμου τοῦ διὰ Διοδώρου τοῦ ἐπὶ τῶν προσόδων... τοῦ Δατάου ἐξ ἱερείων τρα-... τῇ ὠνῇ τὰ καθήκοντα.

"In the reign of Antimachos Theos and Eumenes and Antimachos... the fourth year, month of Olous, in Asangorna, the guardian of the law being... The tax collector Menodotus, in the presence of... who was also sent out by Demonax, the former..., and of Simus who was... by the agency of Diodorus, controller of revenues, acknowledges receipt from... the son of Dataes from the priests... the dues relating to the purchase..."

That Antimachus would list his own associate kings argues strongly against the suggestion that he was appointed as a Northern associate ruler of Euthydemus and Demetrius, an idea that anyway is more or less unprecedented among Hellenistic kings. Eumenes and Antimachus could be his heirs; it was standard for Ptolemaic and Seleucid kings to include their sons as joint regents, with variable formal or actual power. While Eumenes never issued any coins, a king named Antimachus II Nikephoros later appeared in India. It seems plausible that the Indian Antimachus was the son of Antimachus I, but it is unclear whether his reign in India overlapped with his father's reign in Bactria.

Another document written on skin has been found that refers to his reign, and mentions a previously unknown Bactrian city named Amphipolis, presumably named after the famous ancient polis in today's region of Macedonia in Northern Greece. This document was found near Bactra in Northern Afghanistan and reads:

"Βασιλεύοντος Ἀντιμάχου ἔτους τριακοστοῦ [μηνὸς - - ] ... ἐν Ἀμφιπόλει τῇ πρὸς τῇ Κ ἀρελοτηι εἰσηγεῖτα[ι - - τῶν] ... ξένων μαν ηερχολλ μηνον ... τῶν τεσσαρά[κοντα - - - ] ... Σκυθῶν ἀργυρίου ἐπισήμου δραχμῶν ἑκατὸν ... μενοῦ πλήθους τοῦ ἀργυρίου [ - - - ] ...."

"In the reign of Antimachos in the year 30 [month + day] ... in Amphipolis near K[]arelote has introduced ... of the... mercenaries (?) [to] ... of the for[ty ...] Scythians, of one hundred drachmas of coined silver ... of [the above mentioned (?)] sum of money ...."

== Coins of Antimachus I ==
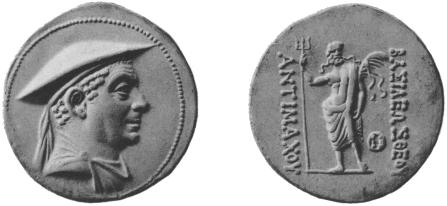
Silver coin of Antimachus I (171–160 BC). Obverse shows Antimachus I wearing a kausia. Reverse shows Poseidon, with Greek legend: ΒΑΣΙΛΕΩΣ ΘΕΟΥ ΑΝΤΙΜΑΧΟΥ, Basileōs Theou Antimachou, "of God King Antimachus".

Antimachus I issued numerous silver coins on the Attic standard, with his own image in a flat Macedonian kausia hat, and on the reverse Poseidon with his trident. Poseidon was the god of the ocean and great rivers - some scholars have here seen a reference to the provinces around the Indus River, where Antimachus I may have been a governor - but he was also the protector of horses, which was perhaps a more important function in landlocked Bactria.

On his coinage, Antimachus called himself Theos, "The God", a first in the Hellenistic world. Just like his colleague Agathocles, he issued commemorative coinage, in his case silver tetradrachms honouring Euthydemus I, also called "The God", and Diodotus I, called "The Saviour". This indicates that Antimachus I might have been instrumental in creating a royal state cult.

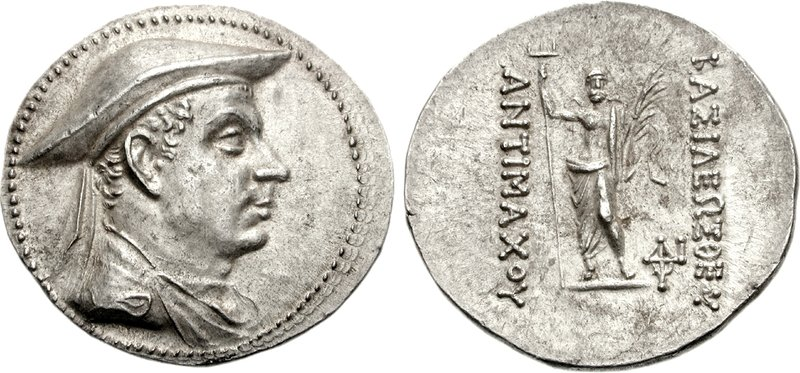
Another silver coin of Antimachus I, with Poseidon on the reverse.

Antimachus I also issued round bronzes depicting an elephant on the obverse, with a reverse showing the Greek goddess of victory Nike holding out a wreath. The elephant could be a Buddhist symbol. These coins are reminiscent of those of Demetrius I, as well as Apollodotus I.

Other bronzes, square and rather crude, also portray a walking elephant, but with a reverse of a thunderbolt. These have been attributed by Bopearachchi (as well as older scholars) to Arachosia. They are Indian in their design, but the legend is only in Greek.

== Notes ==
Preceded by Euthydemus II	Greco-Bactrian King; 185 – 170 BCE	Succeeded by Pantaleon

	Greco-Bactrian kings		Indo-Greek kings					
Territories/ dates	West Bactria	East Bactria	Paropamisade	Arachosia	Gandhara	Western Punjab	Eastern Punjab	Mathura
326-325 BCE	Campaigns of Alexander the Great in India						Nanda Empire	
312 BCE	Creation of the Seleucid Empire						Creation of the Maurya Empire	
305 BCE	Seleucid Empire after Mauryan war		Maurya Empire					
280 BCE	Foundation of Ai-Khanoum							
255–239 BCE	Independence of the Greco-Bactrian kingdom Diodotus I		Emperor Ashoka (268-232 BCE)					
239–223 BCE	Diodotus II							
230–200 BCE	Euthydemus I							
200–190 BCE	Demetrius I				Sunga Empire			
190-185 BCE	Euthydemus II							
190–180 BCE	Agathocles			Pantaleon				
185–170 BCE	Antimachus I							
180–160 BCE			Apollodotus I					
175–170 BCE	Demetrius II							
160–155 BCE			Antimachus II					
170–145 BCE	Eucratides I							
155–130 BCE	Yuezhi occupation, loss of Ai-Khanoum	Eucratides II; Plato; Heliocles I	Menander I					
130–120 BCE	Yuezhi occupation		Zoilus I		Agathoclea			Yavanarajya inscription
120–110 BCE			Lysias		Strato I			Yavanarajya inscription
110–100 BCE			Antialcidas		Heliocles II			Yavanarajya inscription
100 BCE			Polyxenus		Demetrius III			Yavanarajya inscription
100–95 BCE			Philoxenus					Yavanarajya inscription
95–90 BCE			Diomedes	Amyntas		Epander		Yavanarajya inscription
90 BCE			Theophilus	Peucolaus		Thraso		Yavanarajya inscription
90–85 BCE			Nicias	Menander II		Artemidorus		Yavanarajya inscription
90–70 BCE			Hermaeus	Archebius				Yavanarajya inscription
			Yuezhi occupation		Maues (Indo-Scythian)			
75–70 BCE				Vonones	Telephus	Apollodotus II		
65–55 BCE				Spalirises		Hippostratus	Dionysius	
55–35 BCE					Azes I (Indo-Scythians)		Zoilus II	
55–35 BCE					Vijayamitra/ Azilises		Apollophanes	
25 BCE – 10 CE				Gondophares	Zeionises	Kharahostes	Strato II; Strato III	
				Gondophares (Indo-Parthian)			Rajuvula (Indo-Scythian)	
			Kujula Kadphises (Kushan Empire)				Bhadayasa (Indo-Scythian)	Sodasa (Indo-Scythian)
