= Jandial =

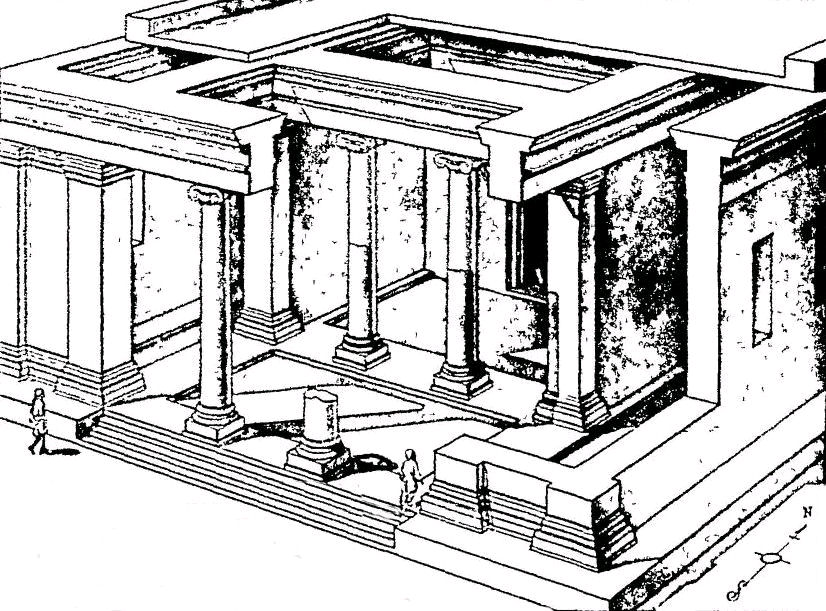
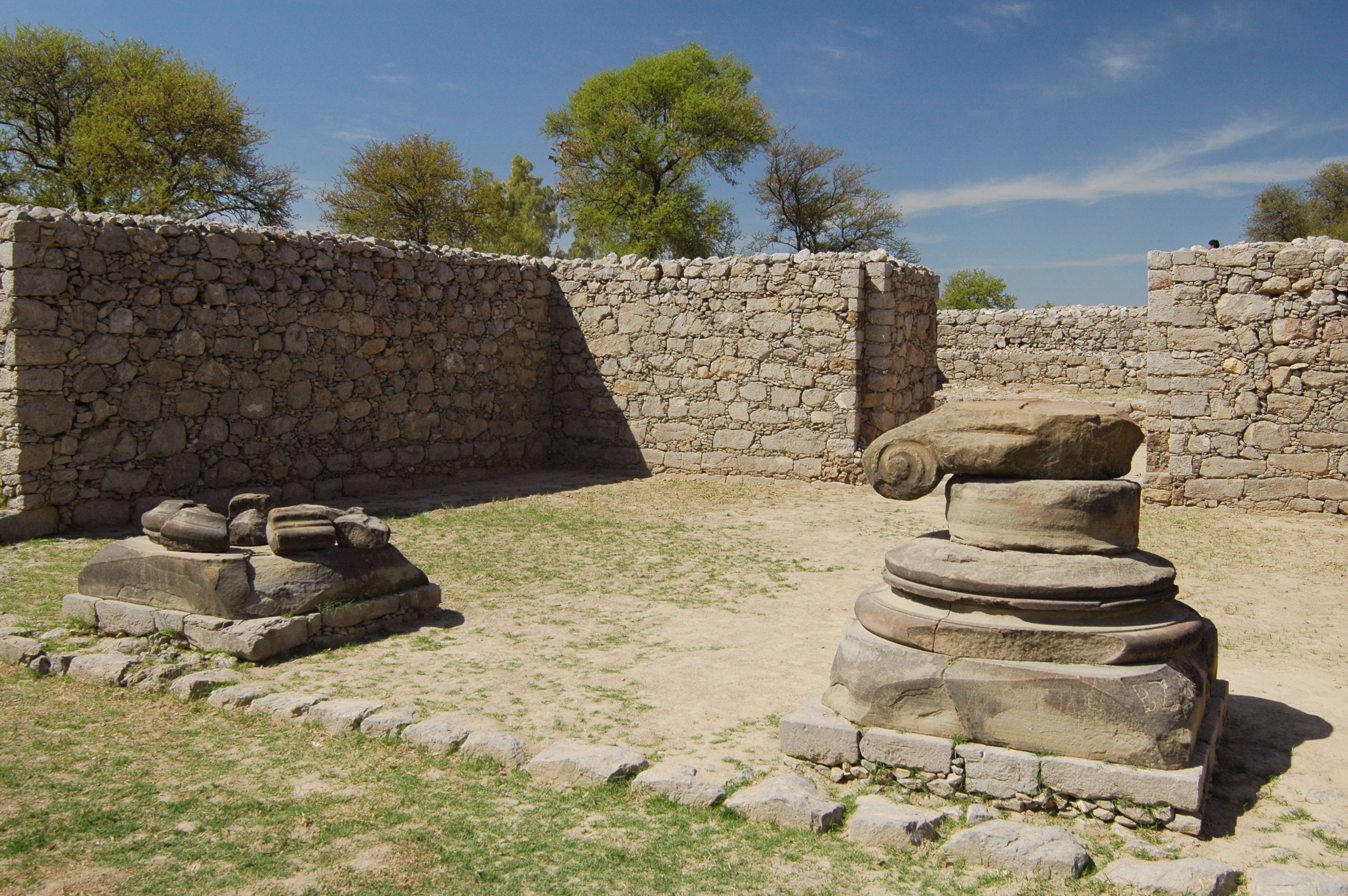
- Reconstitution The Hellenistic temple with Ionic columns at Jandial, Taxila

- Location within Punjab, Pakistan Location within Pakistan Location within Asia
- 33°45′52.1″N 72°49′43.7″E
- Type: Temple

History
- Built: 1st or 2nd century BCE

Site notes
- Archaeologists: Sir John Marshall

UNESCO World Heritage Site
- Official name: Taxila
- Criteria: iii, iv
- Designated: 1980
- Reference no.: 139

Jandial near the city of Taxila in Pakistan is the site of an ancient temple well known for its Ionic columns. The temple is located 630 meters north of the northern gate of Sirkap. The Temple was excavated in 1912–1913 by the Archaeological Survey of India under John Marshall. It has been called the most Hellenic structure yet found on Pakistani soil.

== Temple structure ==
The Temple is considered as a semi-Classical temple. Its design is essentially that of a Greek Temple, with a naos, pronaos and an opisthodomos at the back. Two Ionic columns at the front are framed by two anta walls as in a Greek distyle in antis layout. It seems that the temple had an outside wall with windows or doorways, in a layout similar to that of a Greek encircling row of columns (peripteral design). The dimensions of the Temple were around 45 x 30 meters.

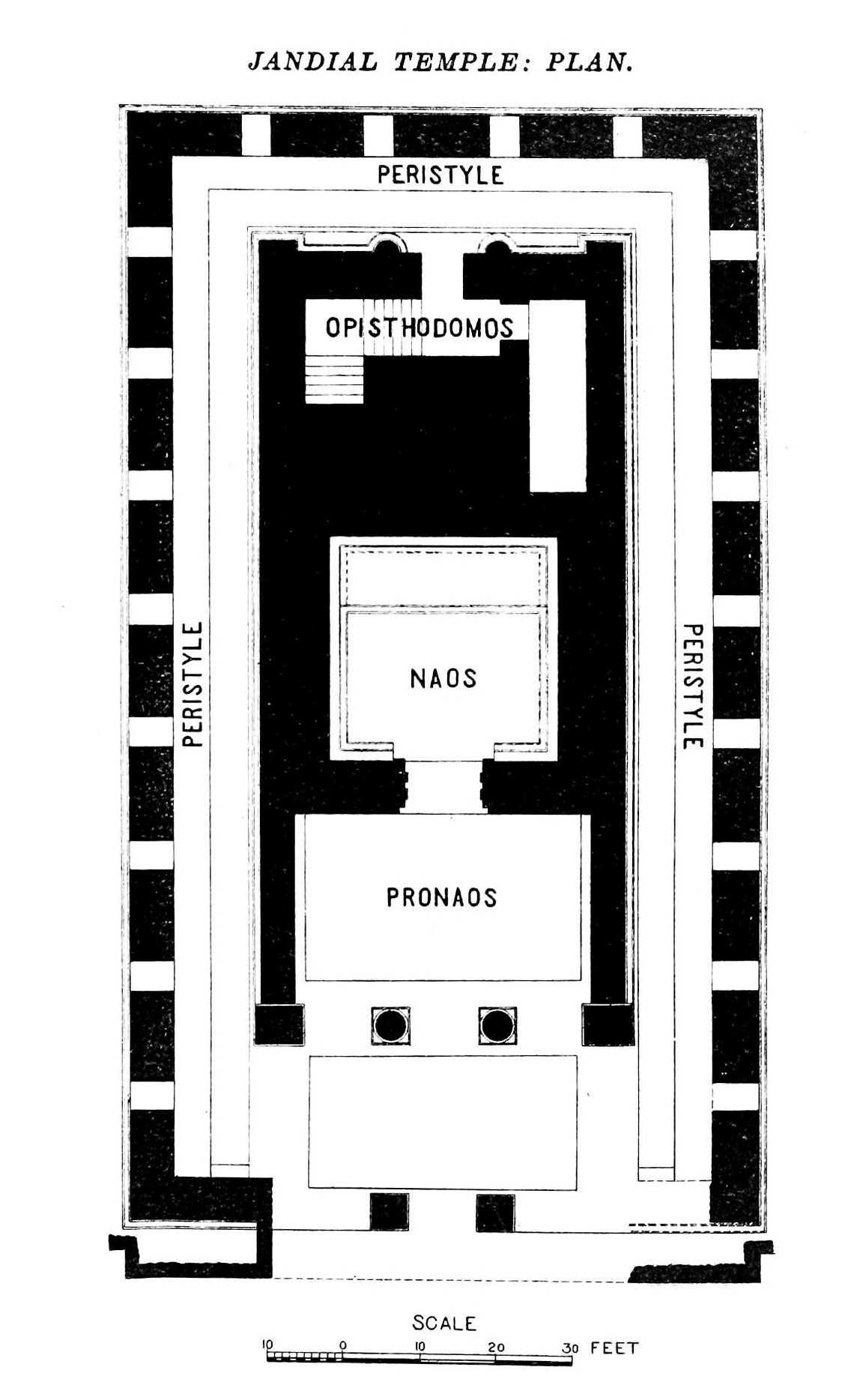
The Temple in Jandial has the general layout of a Greek Temple.

However, inside the Temple, between the naos and the opisthodomos, there is a heavy wall with stairs, which has led some authors to consider that it was designed to support a ziggurat as in a Zoroastrian or Magian temple.

Besides the Pataliputra capital (3rd century BCE), the Ionic style is a rare occurrence in the Indian subcontinent, and it almost disappeared afterwards, apart from a pillar in Ahin Posh, which seems to be more Parthian than truly Hellenistic. It seems to have disappeared with the weakening of direct Greek presence in India, to be exclusively replaced by the numerous instances of Corinthian art that can be found in the Indo-Corinthian capitals of Gandhara.

== Construction ==
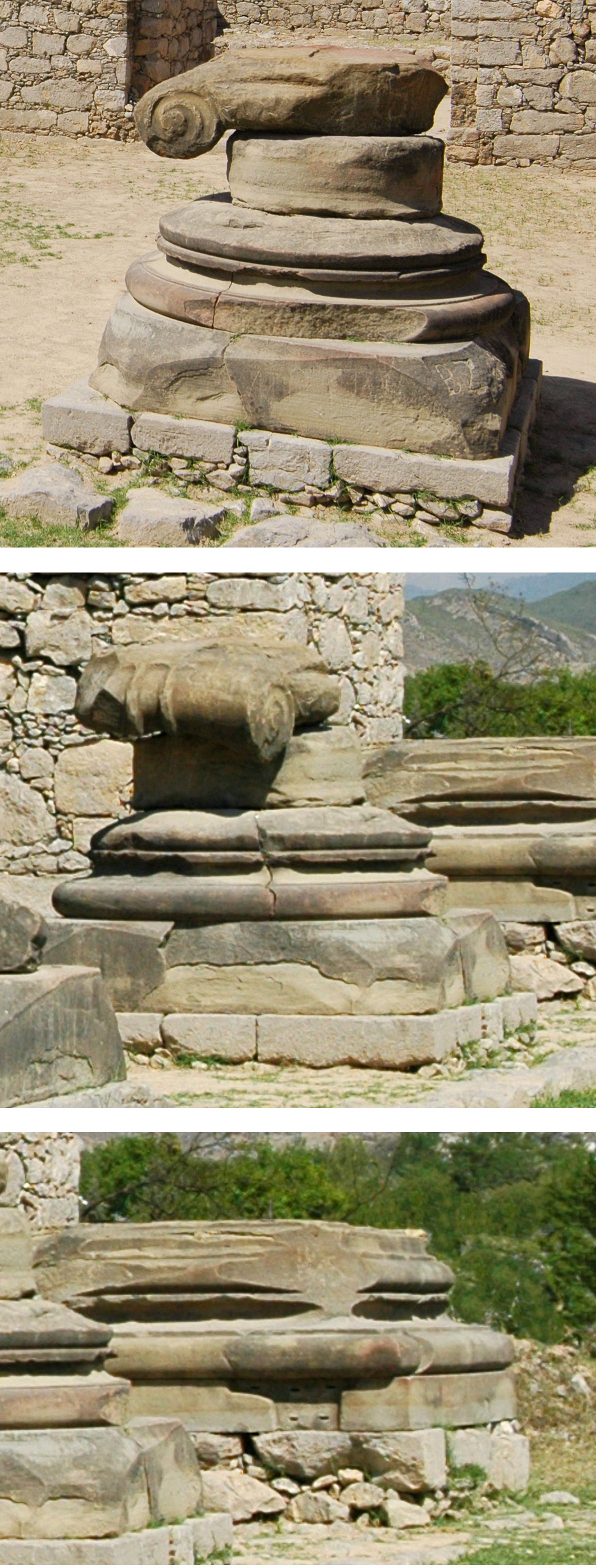
Ionic column and capital and Ionic molded base of anta at Jandial

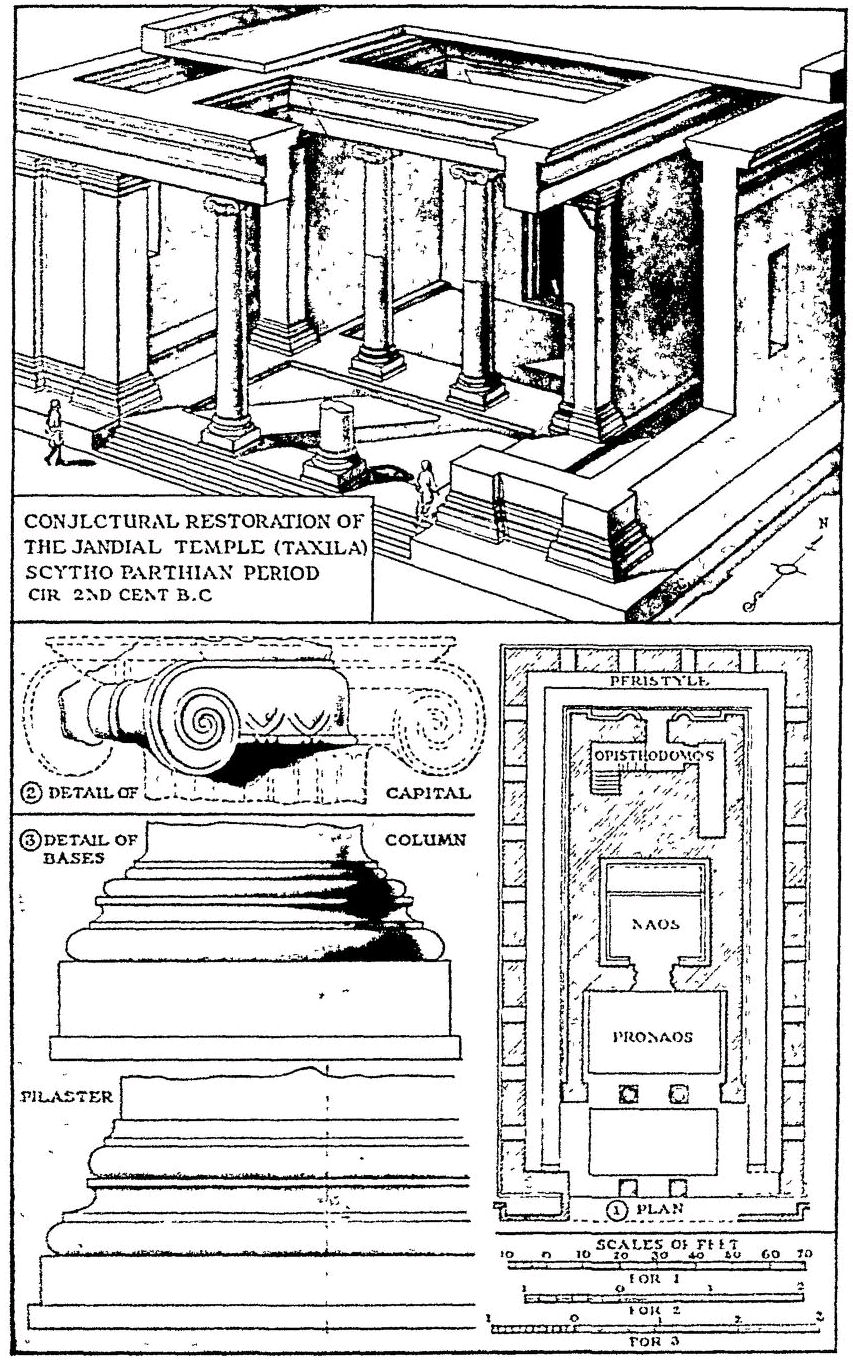
Conjectural restoration of the Jandial Temple

The Ionic capitals of the Jandial temple seem to be a rather provincial and dry version of the Ionic Temple of Artemis in Ephesus. However the design of the bases is quite pure, as are the wall moldings. Also the drums are finely joined with dowels. All this suggests work which was done under Greek supervision, or maybe by Greeks directly.

== Dating ==
The Temple may have been built in the 2nd century BCE under the Greeks in India (Indo-Greeks). The exact alignment of the Temple with Sirkap leads some authors to think that it may have been built during the main occupation period of the Greek city, and that it may have been the work of an architect from Asia Minor, or from Greece or an architect trained in Greek techniques.

Alternatively, it may have been built under the Indo-Parthians in the 1st century BCE in order to practice the Zoroastrian faith, possibly right after their invasion of Hellenistic lands, using Greek manpower and expertise. Alternatively, it may be the construction of a Greek devotee of Zoroastriasm, at it known that in India the Greeks easily followed other faith, as exemplified by the dedication to Garuda made by a Greek envoy on the Heliodorus pillar in Besnagar.

A coin of the Indo-Scythian ruler Azes I was found in the rubbles of the Temple, which may suggest that construction occurred during his reign.

The Jandial Temple may have been the one visited by Apollonius of Tyana during his visit of the subcontinent in the 1st century CE.

"Taxila, they tell us, is about as big as Nineveh, and was fortified fairly well after the manner of Greek cities; and here was the royal residence of the personage who then ruled the empire of Porus. And they saw a Temple, in front of the wall, which was not far short of 100 feet in size, made of stone covered with stucco, and there was constructed within it a shrine, somewhat small as compared with the great size of the Temple which is surrounded with columns, but deserving of notice. For bronze tablets were nailed into each of its walls on which were engraved the exploits of Porus and Alexander."

— "Life of Appolonius of Tyana", Philostratus 2.16-20

== Gallery ==
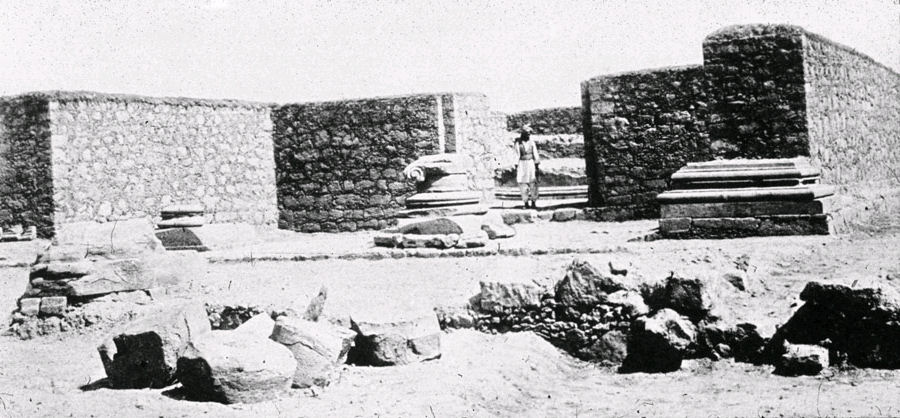
Survey of 1912–13. Remnants of additional pillars can be seen in the front.

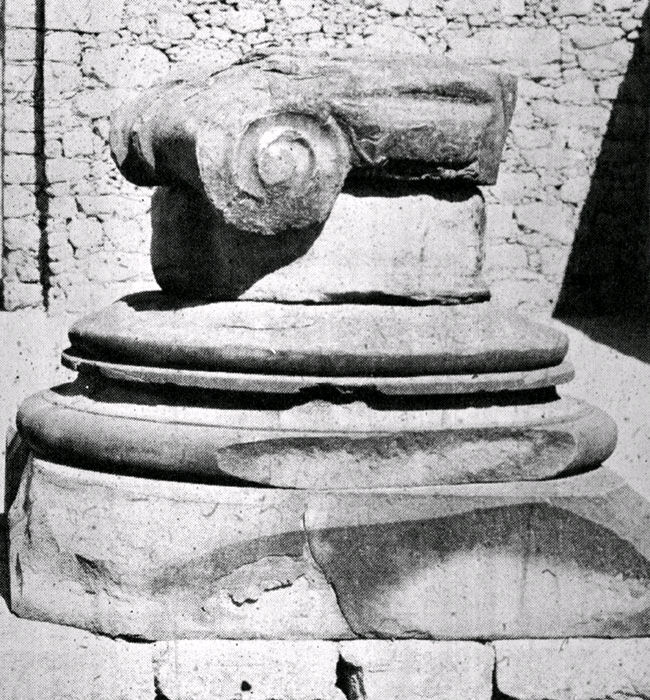
Survey of 1912–13. Decorative details are visible on the capital.

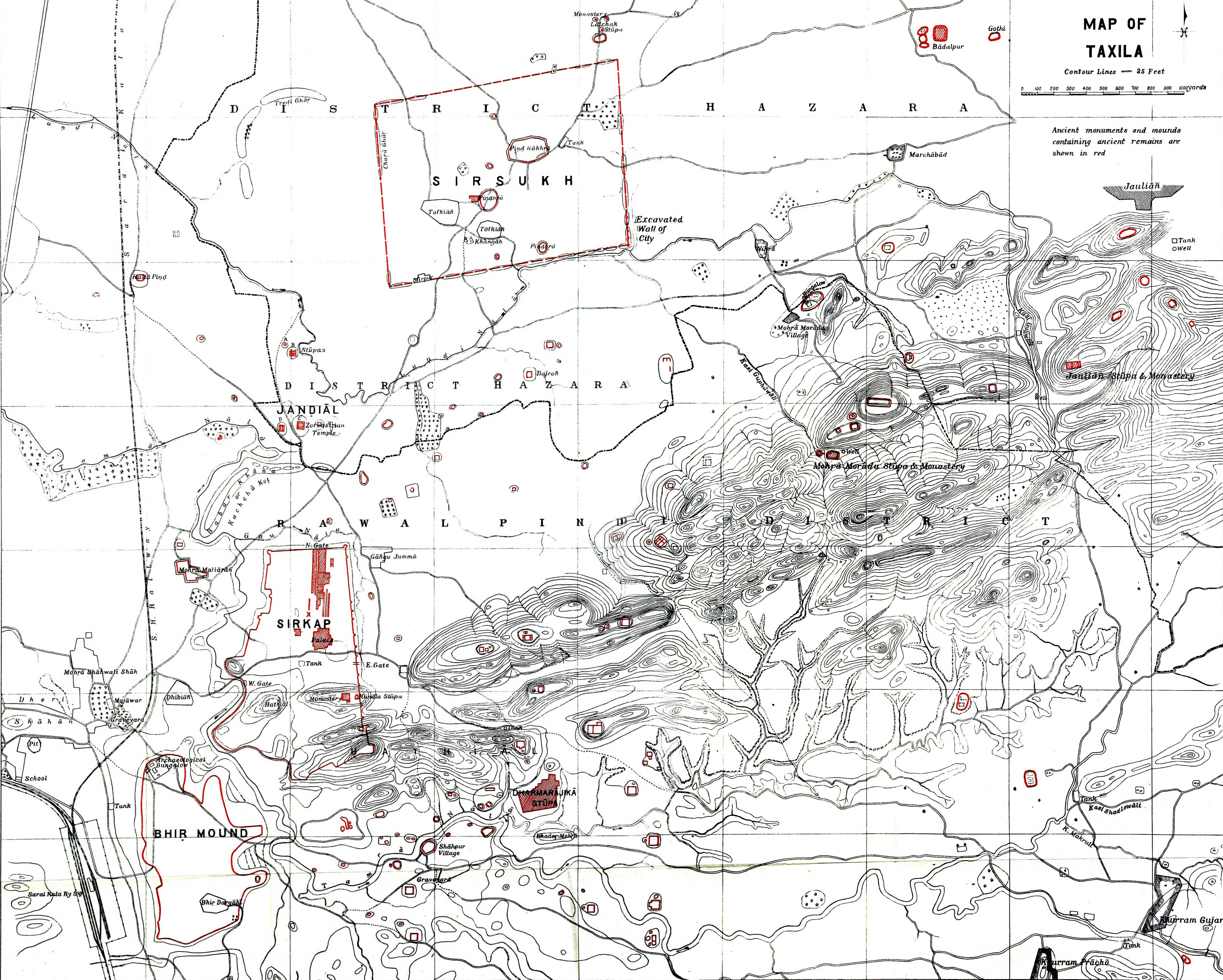
Jandial is located just to the north of Sirkap.

== Jandial D ==
On another mound (Mound D), a little to the west of Jandial, foundations of another temple (Jandial D) which may have been built in the 2nd century BCE under the Greeks as well, were excavated in 1863–64. The temple which has a plan very similar to Jandial had a large front porch measuring 58 feet. Between Jandial and Jandial D ran most probably the ancient high-road to Gandhara.

== Sources ==
- Rowland, Benjamin (1935). "Notes on Ionic Architecture in the East". American Journal of Archaeology. 39 (4): 489–496. doi:10.2307/498156. ISSN 0002-9114.
