= Demetrius I of Bactria =

2nd-century BC Greco-Bactrian and Indo-Greek king

Demetrius I
- King of Kings; Basileus; King of India
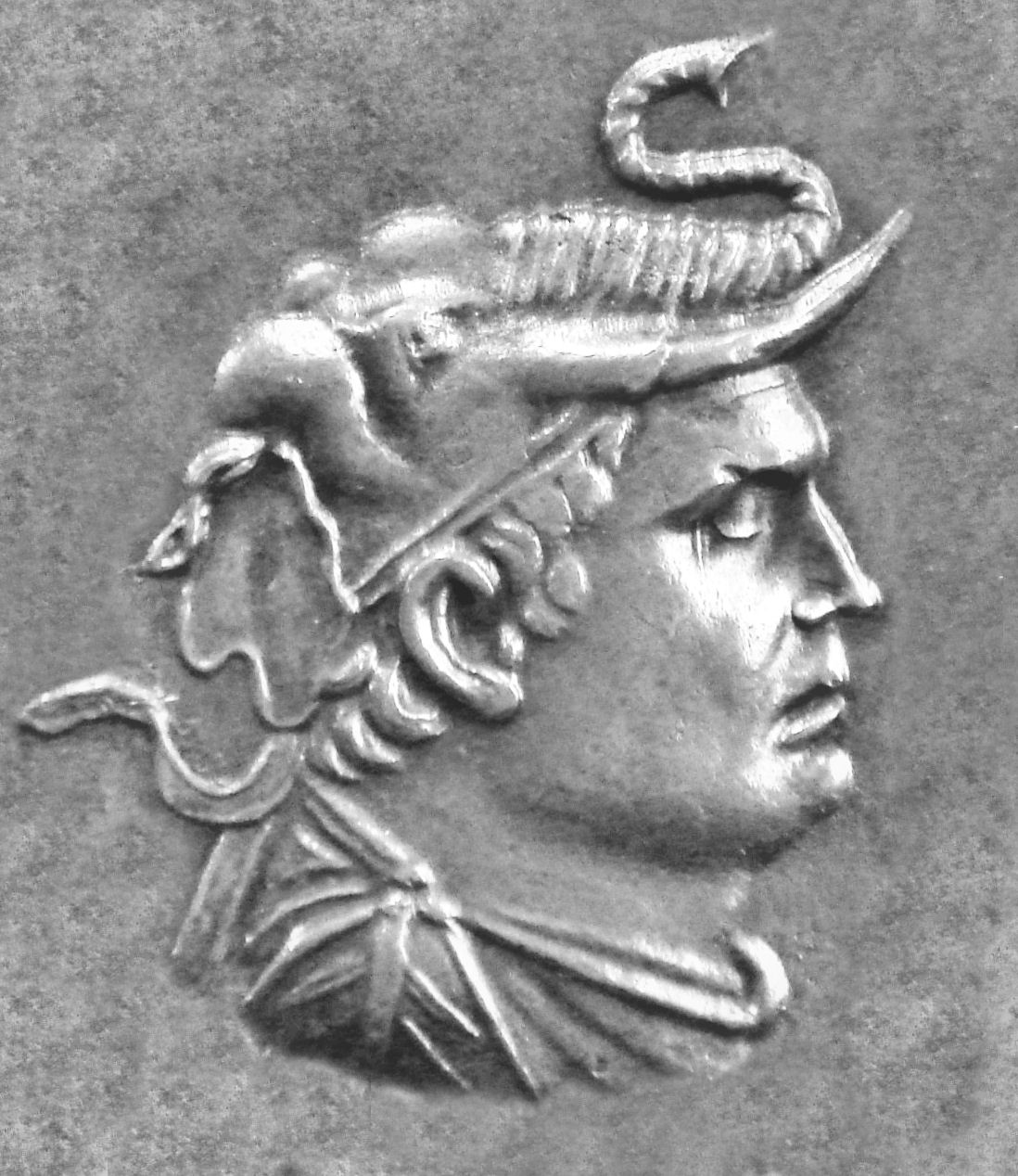
- Portrait of King Demetrius, wearing an elephant scalp and diadem, as shown on his silver coins

King of Bactria
- Reign: c. 200 – c. 180 BC
- Predecessor: Euthydemus I
- Successor: Euthydemus II

Indo-Greek king
- Reign: c. 200 - 180 or 167 BC
- Predecessor: Position Established
- Successor: Pantaleon
- Born: c. 222 BC; Bactria
- Died: c. 180 or 167 BC; India
- Spouse: Daughter of Antiochus III and Laodice III
- Issue: Agathocles of Bactria; Euthydemus II; Demetrius II (uncertain); Berenice of Bactria
- Dynasty: Euthydemid
- Father: Euthydemus I

Demetrius I Anicetus (Ancient Greek: Δημήτριος Ἀνίκητος, romanized: Dēmḗtrios Aníkētos, "Demetrius the Unconquered"), also called Dimetriya or Dhammamita in Indian sources, was a Greco-Bactrian king and the founder of the Indo-Greek kingdom, who ruled areas from Bactria to ancient northwestern India.

He was the son of the Greco-Bactrian ruler Euthydemus I, an Ionian-Greek from one of the Magnesias in Ionia, though it is uncertain from which one (Magnesia on the Maeander or Magnesia ad Sipylum).

He succeeded him around 200 BC, after which he conquered extensive areas in what is now southern Afghanistan, Pakistan and northwestern India. He was never defeated in battle and was posthumously referred to as "the Unconquered" (Ἀνίκητος, Aniketos) on the pedigree coins of his successor Agathocles of Bactria. Demetrius I may have been the initiator of the Yavana era, starting in 186–185 BC, which was used for several centuries thereafter.

Demetrius was the name of at least two and probably three Bactrian Greek kings. The much debated Demetrius II was a possible relative, whereas Demetrius III (c. 100 BC), is known only from numismatic evidence.

== Encounter with Antiochus III ==
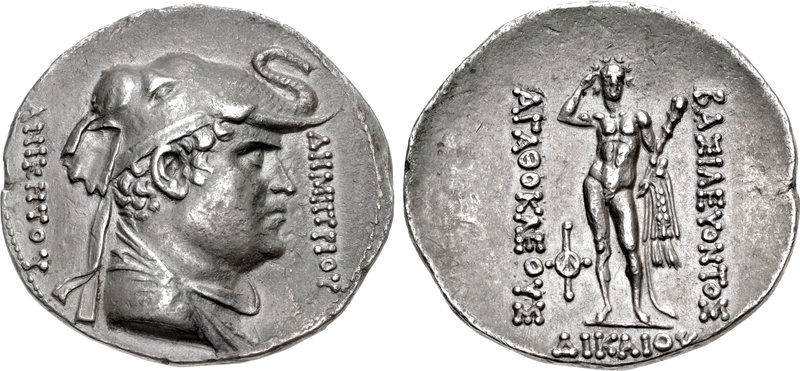
Commemorative coin of Agathocles of Bactria, for Demetrius I. Obverse with the Greek legend: ΔΗΜΗΤΡΙΟΥ ΑΝΙΚΗΤΟΥ, Dēmētriou Anikētou, "Of Demetrius the Unconquered". The reverse showing standing Heracles, and the Greek inscription: ΒΑΣΙΛΕΥΟΝΤΟΣ ΔΙΚΑΙΟΥ ΑΓΑΘΟΚΛΕΟΥΣ, Basileuontos Dikaiou Agathokleous, "Of Agathocles the Just, ruling as King". British Museum.

The father of Demetrius, Euthydemus I, was attacked by the Seleucid ruler Antiochus III around 210 BC. Although he commanded 10,000 horsemen, Euthydemus initially lost a battle on the Arius and had to retreat. He then successfully resisted a three-year siege in the fortified city of Bactra, before Antiochus finally decided to recognize the new ruler.

The final negotiations were made between Antiochus III and Demetrius. Antiochus III was reportedly highly impressed by the demeanour of the young prince, and offered him one of his daughters in marriage, around 206 BC:

"And after several journeys of Teleas to and fro between the two, Euthydemus at last sent his son Demetrius to confirm the terms of the treaty. Antiochus received the young prince; and judging from his appearance, conversation, and the dignity of his manners that he was worthy of royal power, he first promised to give him one of his own daughters, and secondly conceded the royal title to his father." Polybius 11.34

The term used for "young prince" is neaniskos (νεανίσκος), suggesting an age around 16, which in turn gives a birth date for Demetrius around 222 BC.

=== Kuliab inscription ===
In an inscription found in the Kuliab area of Tajikistan, in western Greco-Bactria, and dated to 200–195 BC, a Greek by the name of Heliodotus, dedicating a fire altar to Hestia, mentions Euthydemus and Demetrius:

τόνδε σοι βωμὸν θυώδη, πρέσβα κυδίστη θεῶν
Ἑστία, Διὸς κ(α)τ᾽ ἄλσος καλλίδενδρον ἔκτισεν
καὶ κλυταῖς ἤσκησε λοιβαῖς ἐμπύροις Ἡλιόδοτος
ὄφρα τὸμ πάντων μέγιστον Εὐθύδημον βασιλέων
τοῦ τε παῖδα καλλίνικον ἐκπρεπῆ Δημήτριον
πρευμενὴς σώιζηις ἐκηδεῖ(ς) σὺν τύχαι θεόφρον[ι]

Translation:

"Heliodotos dedicated this fragrant altar for Hestia,
venerable goddess, illustrious amongst all, in the grove of Zeus, with beautiful trees;
he made libations and sacrifices,
so that the greatest of all kings Euthydemos,
as well as his son, the glorious, victorious and remarkable Demetrios,
be preserved from all pains, with the help of Tyche with divine thoughts."

== Invasion of India ==
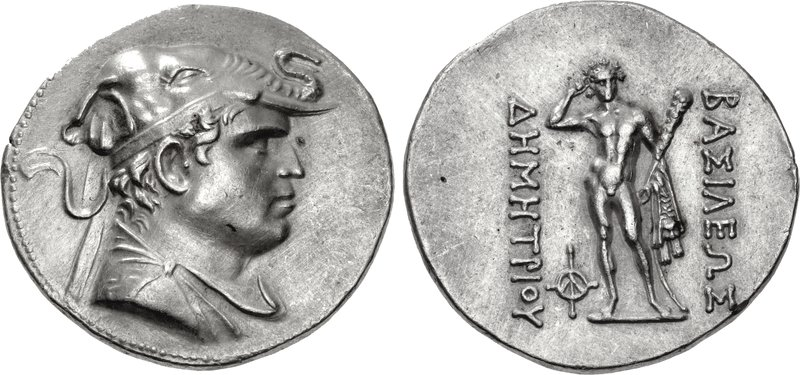
Silver tetradrachm of Demetrius I. Obverse with the diademed and draped bust of king, wearing elephant-skin headdress (evoking Alexander the Great and his conquests in India). Reverse shows Heracles standing, crowning himself, holding club and lion skin. Greek legend reads: ΒΑΣΙΛΕΩΣ ΔΗΜΗΤΡΙΟΥ, Basileōs Dēmētriou, "of King Demetrius".

Demetrius started the invasion of northwestern India between 190 and 180 BC, following the destruction of the Mauryan dynasty by the general Pushyamitra Shunga, who then founded the new Indian Shunga dynasty (180–78 BC). The Greco-Bactrians might have invaded the Indus Valley to protect Greek expatriates in the Indian Subcontinent. Also, the Mauryans had had diplomatic alliances with the Greeks, and they may have been considered as allies by the Greco-Bactrians. According to the Sri Lankan Paramparapustaka chronicle, Demetrius gave a daughter in marriage to the Mauryan Emperor Brihadratha before the latter was deposed around 180 BC.

Demetrius may have first started to recover the province of Arachosia, an area south of the Hindu Kush already inhabited by many Greeks but ruled by the Mauryas since the annexation of the territory by Chandragupta from Seleucus. In his Parthian Stations, Isidorus of Charax mentions a city named Demetrias, supposedly founded by Demetrius himself:

"Beyond is Arachosia. And the Parthians call this White India; there are the city of Biyt and the city of Pharsana and the city of Chorochoad and the city of Demetrias; then Alexandropolis, the metropolis of Arachosia; it is Greek, and by it flows the river Arachotus. As far as this place the land is under the rule of the Parthians."

The Greek geographer Strabo described the conquests of Demetrius in his Geographica:

"The Greeks who caused Bactria to revolt grew so powerful on account of the fertility of the country that they became masters, not only of Ariana, but also of India, as Apollodorus of Artemita says: and more tribes were subdued by them than by Alexander—by Menander in particular (at least if he actually crossed the Hypanis towards the east and advanced as far as the Imaüs), for some were subdued by him personally and others by Demetrius, the son of Euthydemus the king of the Bactrians."

The Greek campaigns may have gone as far as the capital Pataliputra in eastern India (today Patna):

"Those who came after Alexander went to the Ganges and Pataliputra" (Strabo, XV.698)

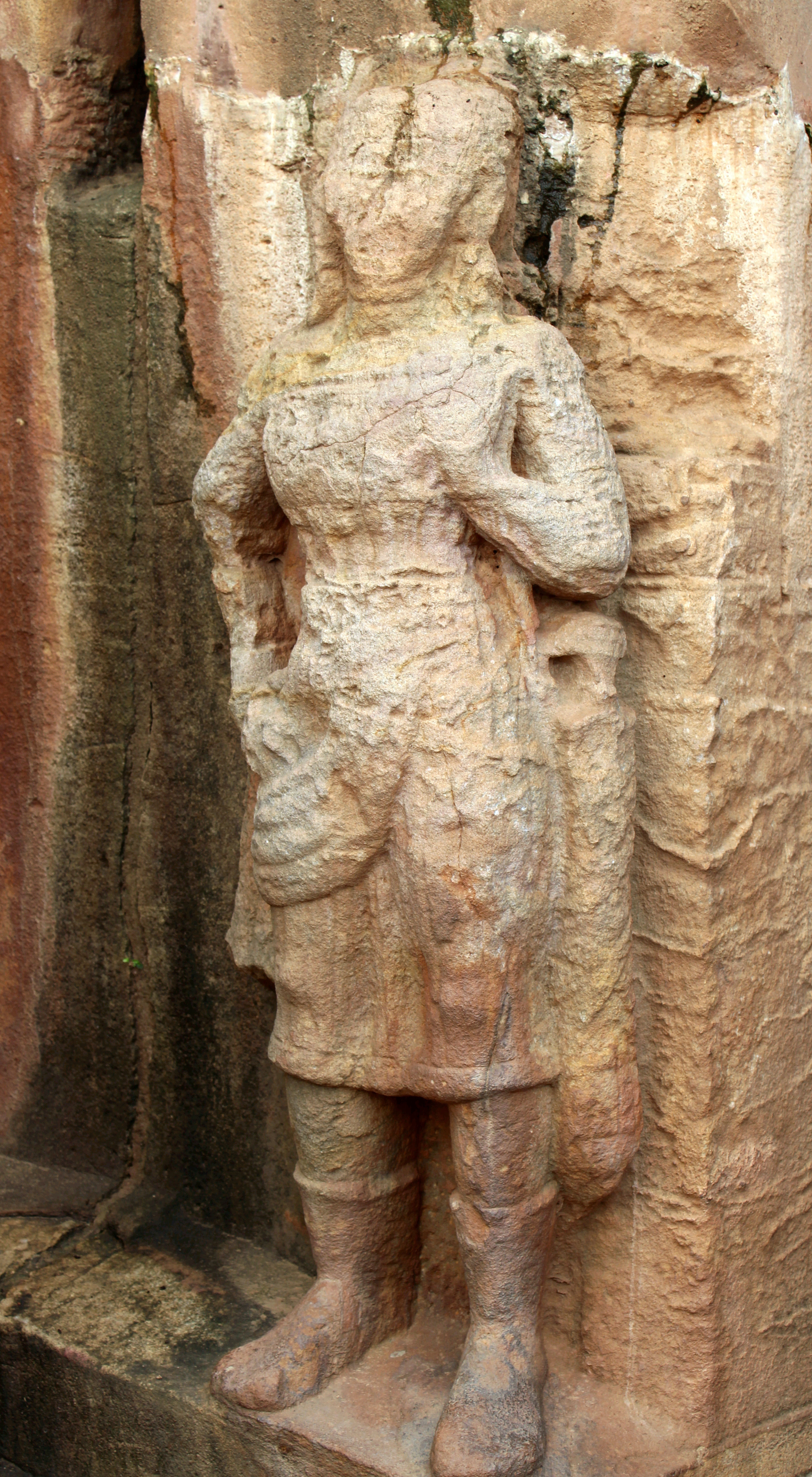
A Yavana (greek) warrior statue in Rani ki noor, Khandagiri

It is generally considered that Demetrius ruled in Taxila (where many of his coins were found in the archaeological site of Sirkap). The Indian records also describes Greek attacks on Saketa, Panchala, Mathura and Pataliputra (Gargi-Samhita, Yuga Purana chapter). However, the campaigns to Pataliputra are generally attested to the later king Menander I and Demetrius I probably only invaded areas in Pakistan. Other kings may have expanded the territory as well. By c. 175 BC, the Indo-Greeks ruled parts of northwestern India, while the Shungas remained in the Gangetic, Central, and Eastern India.

The Hathigumpha inscription of the Kalinga king Kharavela mentions that fearing him, a Yavana (Greek) king or general retreated to Mathura with his demoralized army. The name of the Yavana king is not clear, but it contains three letters, and the middle letter can be read as ma or mi. Some historians, such as R. D. Banerji and K. P. Jayaswal reconstructed the name of the Yavana king as "Dimita", and identified him with Demetrius. However, several other historians, such as Ramaprasad Chanda, Sailendra Nath Sen and P. L. Gupta disagree with this interpretation.

== Aftermath ==
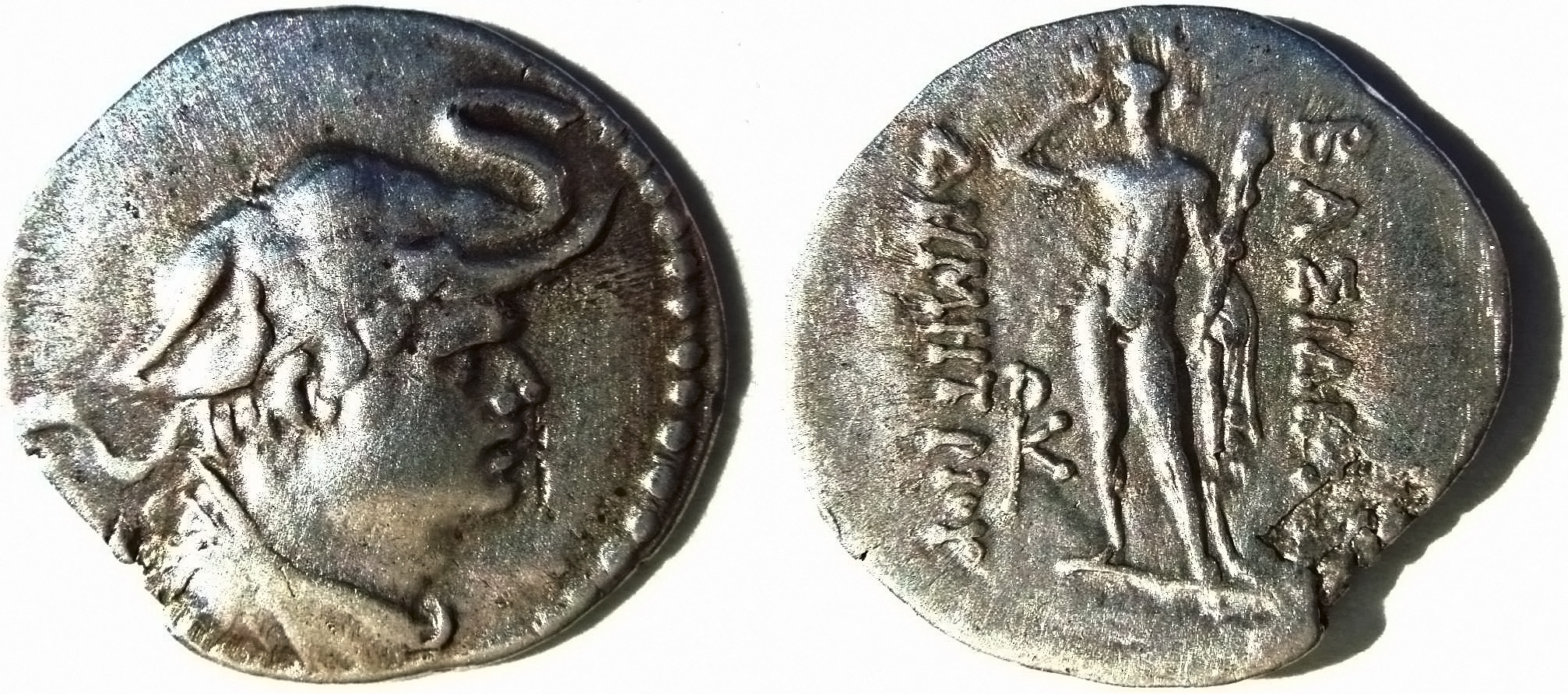
Silver obol of Demetrius I. Extremely small (12 millimeters in diameter), but beautifully crafted.

Demetrius I died of unknown reasons, and the date 180 BC is merely a suggestion aimed to allow suitable regnal periods for subsequent kings, of which there were several. Even if some of them were co-regents, civil wars and temporary divisions of the empire are most likely.

The kings Pantaleon, Agathocles, Antimachus I and possibly Euthydemus II ruled after Demetrius I, and theories about their origin include all of them being relatives of Demetrius I, or only Antimachus. It is highly likely that Agathocles was a son of Demetrius I. Eventually, the kingdom of Bactria fell to the able newcomer Eucratides.

Demetrius II was a later king, possibly a son or nephew of his namesake, and he ruled in India only. Justin mentions him being defeated by the Bactrian king Eucratides, an event which took place at the end of the latter's reign, possibly around 150 BC. Demetrius II left behind his generals Apollodotus and Menander, who in turn became kings of India and rulers of the Indo-Greek Kingdom following his death.

Geoffrey Chaucer names Demetrius among the combatants at a tournament held in Athens by Theseus:

The grete Emetreus, the kyng of Inde,
Upon a steede bay trapped in steel,
Covered in clooth of gold, dyapred weel,
Cam ridynge lyk the God of armes, Mars.

— Geoffrey Chaucer, The Knight's Tale, ll. 2156–2159

== Demetrius as Deva Wubujing–Gobujo ==
Lucas Christopoulos’s article explores the idea that Demetrius of Bactria, was later remembered in Buddhist traditions as the divine figure Deva Gobujo (Wubujing)in China and in Japan. He argues that this transformation reflects a process of religious and cultural syncretism, where Demetrius became absorbed into Buddhist cosmologies. Christopoulos shows how Demetrius became worshipped later as a protector of the Dharma. He situates this within a wider context of Hellenistic influence reaching Central and East Asia mainly from Gandhara, passing through the Tarim Basin and the Gansu (Hexi) corridor.

== Coinage ==
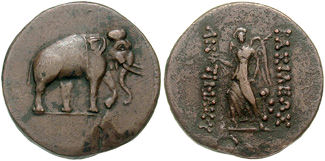
Coin of Demetrius I showing an Indian elephant walking on the obverse, and the winged goddess Nike on the reverse. Greek inscription reads: ΒΑΣΙΛΕΩΣ ΔΗΜΗΤΡΙΟΥ, "Of King Demetrius".

The coins of Demetrius are of five types. One bilingual type with Greek and Kharoshthi legends exists; it is naturally associated with the Indian Demetrius II. A series with the king in diadem are likely to be early issues of Demetrius I.

There is also one series representing a Gorgon shield on the obverse and a trident on the reverse.

There are also three types depicting elephants. The first type shows Demetrius (I) with elephant-crown, a well-known symbol of India, which simply denotes his conquests in India, as Alexander the Great had also done on his coinage before. One type represents an elephant with Nike on the other side holding a wreath of victory. This sort of symbolism can be seen on the reverse of the coins of Antialcidas in which Nike (supported by Zeus) directly hands the victory wreath to the elephant on the same coin face.

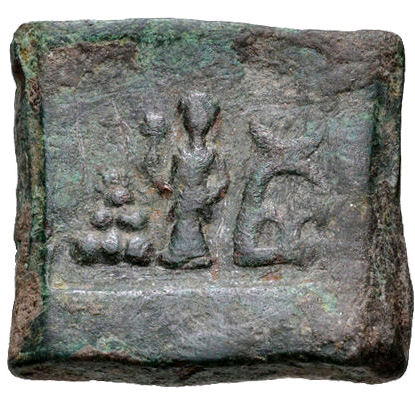
Taxila single-die coin with Lakshmi and arched-hill symbol (185–160 BC)

=== Indian coinage in Gandhara (after 185 BC) ===
The year 186 BC, with the invasion of the Greco-Bactrians into India, marks an evolution in the design of single-die cast coins in the coinage of Gandhara, as deities and realistic animals were introduced. At the same time coinage technology also evolved, as double-die coins (engraved on both sides, obverse and reverse) started to appear. The archaeological excavations of coins have shown that these coins, as well as the new double die coins, were contemporary with those of the Indo-Greeks. According to Osmund Bopearachchi these coins, and particularly those depicting the goddess Lakshmi, were probably minted by Demetrius I following his invasion of Gandhara.

== Buddhism ==
Buddhism flourished under the Indo-Greek kings, and it has been suggested by W. W. Tarn that their invasion of India was intended to show their support for the Mauryan empire in reaction to the persecution by the Sungas against Buddhism. However, that persecution in turn is debatable, with contemporary historians such as Romila Thapar suggesting that some of the accounts might be the product of exaggeration from Buddhist missionaries. Thapar attributes purely economic motivations to the Indo-Greek invasion of Southern Asia.

=== Elephant with the caduceus coinage ===
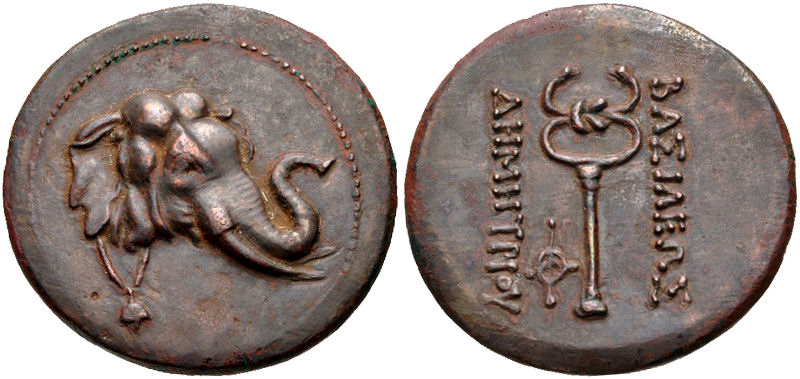
Coin of Demetrius I with an elephant wearing a bell and raising trunk on the obverse, and the caduceus on the reverse

One of Demetrius's "elephant" types represents a rejoicing elephant, depicted on the front on the coin and surrounded by the royal bead-and-reel decoration, and therefore treated on the same level as a King. The elephant, one of the symbols of Buddhism and Gautama Buddha, possibly represents the victory of Buddhism brought about by Demetrius. Alternatively, though, the elephant has been described as a possible symbol of the Indian capital of Taxila (Tarn), or as a symbol of India as a whole.

The reverse of the coin depicts the caduceus, symbol of reconciliation between two fighting serpents, which is possibly a representation of peace between the Greeks and the Shungas, and likewise between Buddhism and Hinduism (the caduceus also appears as a symbol of the punch-marked coins of the Maurya Empire in India, in the 3rd–2nd century BC).

Unambiguous Buddhist symbols are found on later Greek coins of Menander I or Menander II, but the conquests of Demetrius I did influence the Buddhist religion in India.

== Gallery ==
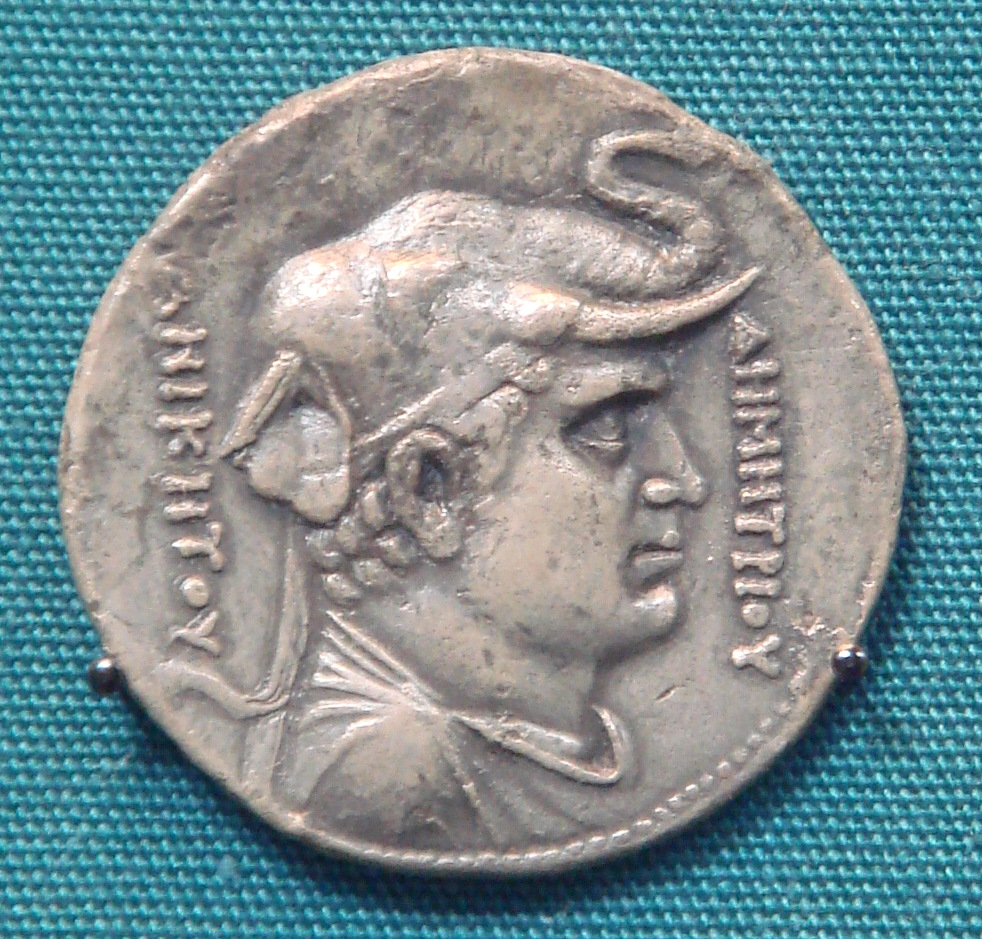
A pedigree coin of Agathocles for Demetrius I. The Greek legend reads: ΔΗΜΗΤΡΙΟΥ ΑΝΙΚΗΤΟΥ, Dēmētriou Anikētou, "Of Demetrius the Unconquered".

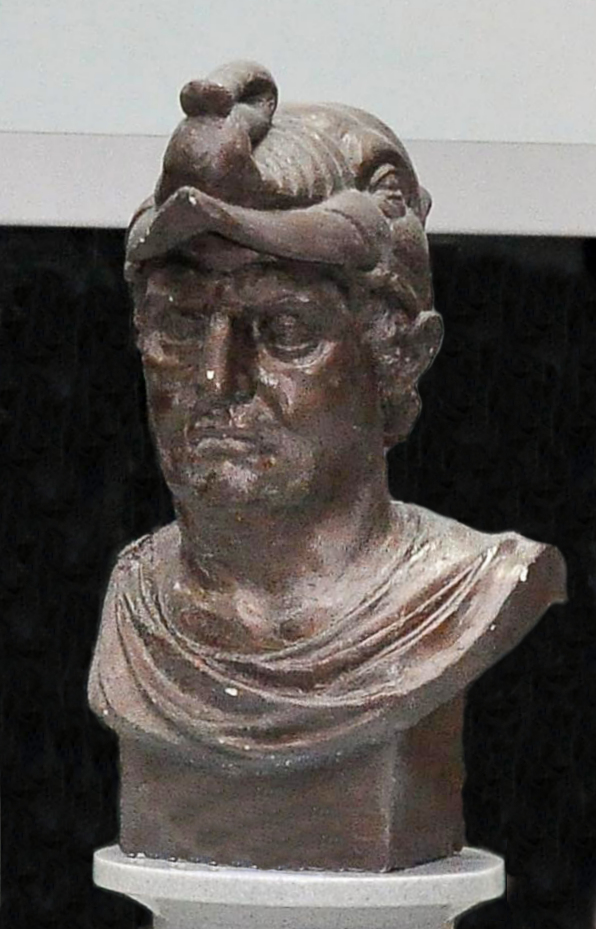
A statue likely depicting Demetrius I of Bactria. Termez Archaeological Museum.

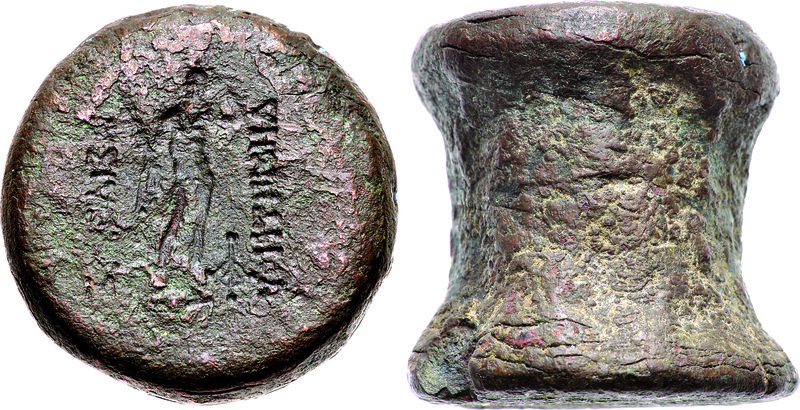
A remarkable reverse die, once used to make the silver tetradrachms of Demetrius I. One of the very few coin dies to survive from the Hellenistic period; 2nd century BC.

== See also ==
- Seleucid Empire
- Indo-Scythians
- Indo-Parthian Kingdom
- Kushan Empire

Preceded by Euthydemus I	Greco-Bactrian Ruler and Indo-Greek king 205–171 BC	Succeeded by Euthydemus II (in Bactria)
Preceded by Euthydemus I	Greco-Bactrian Ruler and Indo-Greek king 205–171 BC	Succeeded by Agathocles (in Paropamisadae)
Preceded by Euthydemus I	Greco-Bactrian Ruler and Indo-Greek king 205–171 BC	Succeeded by Pantaleon (in Arachosia, Gandhara)

	Greco-Bactrian kings		Indo-Greek kings					
Territories/ dates	West Bactria	East Bactria	Paropamisade	Arachosia	Gandhara	Western Punjab	Eastern Punjab	Mathura
326-325 BCE	Campaigns of Alexander the Great in India						Nanda Empire	
312 BCE	Creation of the Seleucid Empire						Creation of the Maurya Empire	
305 BCE	Seleucid Empire after Mauryan war		Maurya Empire					
280 BCE	Foundation of Ai-Khanoum							
255–239 BCE	Independence of the Greco-Bactrian kingdom Diodotus I		Emperor Ashoka (268-232 BCE)					
239–223 BCE	Diodotus II							
230–200 BCE	Euthydemus I							
200–190 BCE	Demetrius I				Sunga Empire			
190-185 BCE	Euthydemus II							
190–180 BCE	Agathocles			Pantaleon				
185–170 BCE	Antimachus I							
180–160 BCE			Apollodotus I					
175–170 BCE	Demetrius II							
160–155 BCE			Antimachus II					
170–145 BCE	Eucratides I							
155–130 BCE	Yuezhi occupation, loss of Ai-Khanoum	Eucratides II; Plato; Heliocles I	Menander I					
130–120 BCE	Yuezhi occupation		Zoilus I		Agathoclea			Yavanarajya inscription
120–110 BCE			Lysias		Strato I			Yavanarajya inscription
110–100 BCE			Antialcidas		Heliocles II			Yavanarajya inscription
100 BCE			Polyxenus		Demetrius III			Yavanarajya inscription
100–95 BCE			Philoxenus					Yavanarajya inscription
95–90 BCE			Diomedes	Amyntas		Epander		Yavanarajya inscription
90 BCE			Theophilus	Peucolaus		Thraso		Yavanarajya inscription
90–85 BCE			Nicias	Menander II		Artemidorus		Yavanarajya inscription
90–70 BCE			Hermaeus	Archebius				Yavanarajya inscription
			Yuezhi occupation		Maues (Indo-Scythian)			
75–70 BCE				Vonones	Telephus	Apollodotus II		
65–55 BCE				Spalirises		Hippostratus	Dionysius	
55–35 BCE					Azes I (Indo-Scythians)		Zoilus II	
55–35 BCE					Vijayamitra/ Azilises		Apollophanes	
25 BCE – 10 CE				Gondophares	Zeionises	Kharahostes	Strato II; Strato III	
				Gondophares (Indo-Parthian)			Rajuvula (Indo-Scythian)	
			Kujula Kadphises (Kushan Empire)				Bhadayasa (Indo-Scythian)	Sodasa (Indo-Scythian)
