= Sirkap =

Archaeological site near Taxila, Punjab, Pakistan

- سرکپ (Urdu); Σιρκάπ (Greek)
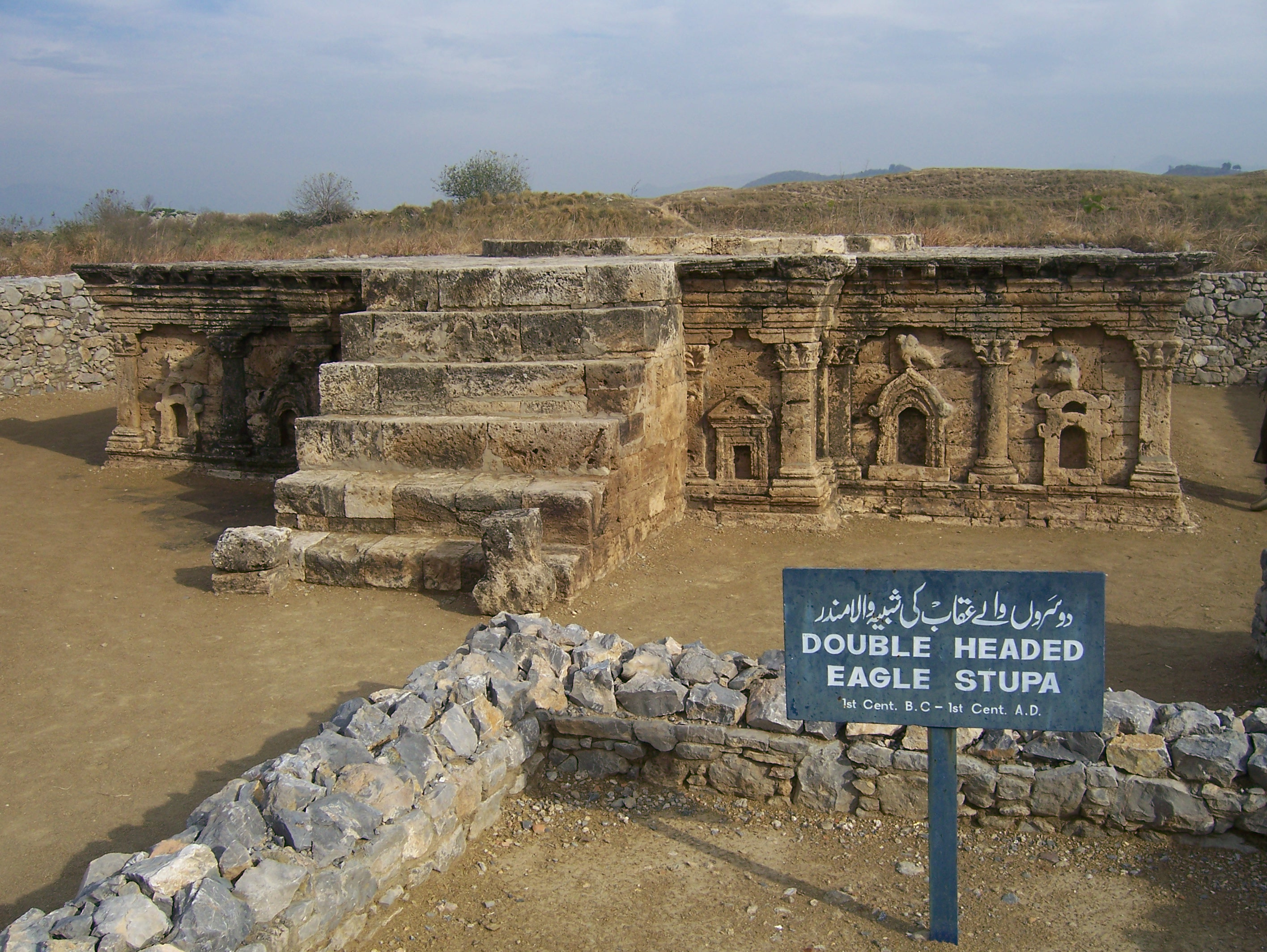
- Double-Headed Eagle Stupa at Sirkap Taxila archaeological sites

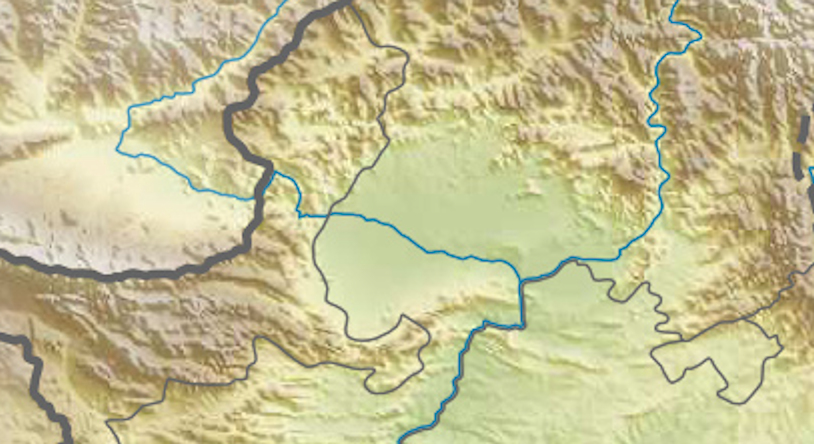
- Location within Pakistan Location within Gandhara
- 33.757669°N 72.829332°E
- Type: Settlement
- Cultures: Gandhara, Indo-Greek

Site notes
- Archaeologists: Sir John Marshall

UNESCO World Heritage Site
- Official name: Taxila
- Criteria: iii, iv
- Designated: 1980
- Reference no.: 139

Sirkap (Urdu and Punjabi: سرکپ) is the name of an archaeological site on the bank opposite to the city of Taxila, Punjab, Pakistan.

The city of Sirkap was built by the Greco-Bactrian king Demetrius after he invaded modern-day Pakistan around 180 BC. Demetrius founded an Indo-Greek kingdom that was to last until around 10 BC. Sirkap is also said to have been rebuilt by king Menander I.

== Archaeological excavations ==
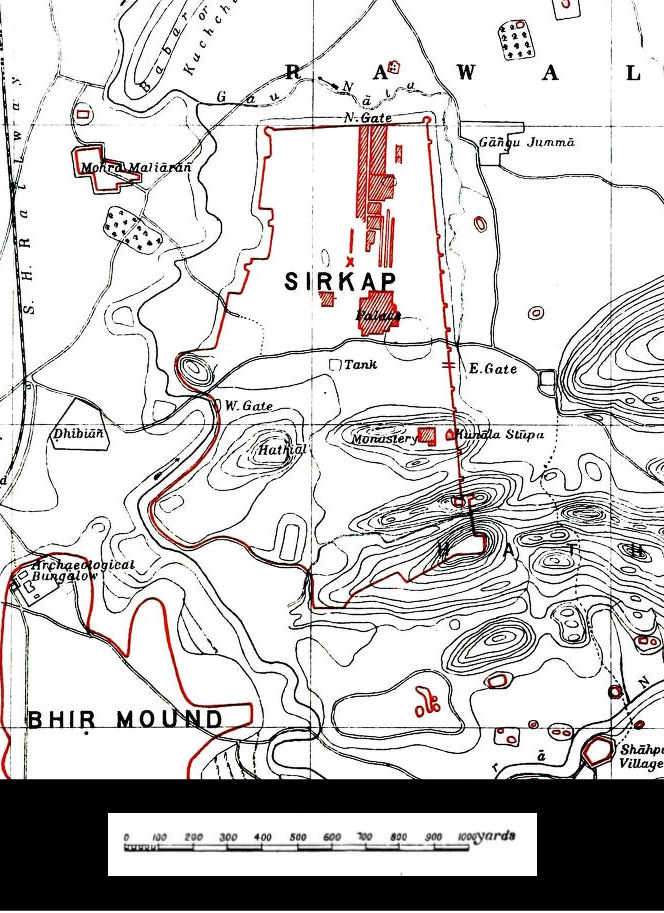
Map of Sirkap excavations.

The excavation of the old city was carried out under the supervision of Sir John Marshall by Hergrew from 1912–1930. In 1944 and 1945 further parts were excavated by Mortimer Wheeler and his colleagues. Most of the discoveries at Sirkap related to the Indo-Scythian and Indo-Parthian periods (1st-2nd century CE). Overall excavations to the Greek levels have been very limited, and probably much remains hidden underground: in Sirkap, only about one eighth of the excavations were made down to the Indo-Greek and early Indo-Scythian levels, and this only in an area far removed from the center of the ancient city, where few discoveries could be expected.

== Greek city ==
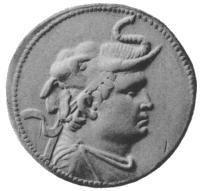
The Greco-Bactrian king Demetrius (r.c. 200–180 BC), founder of Sirkap.

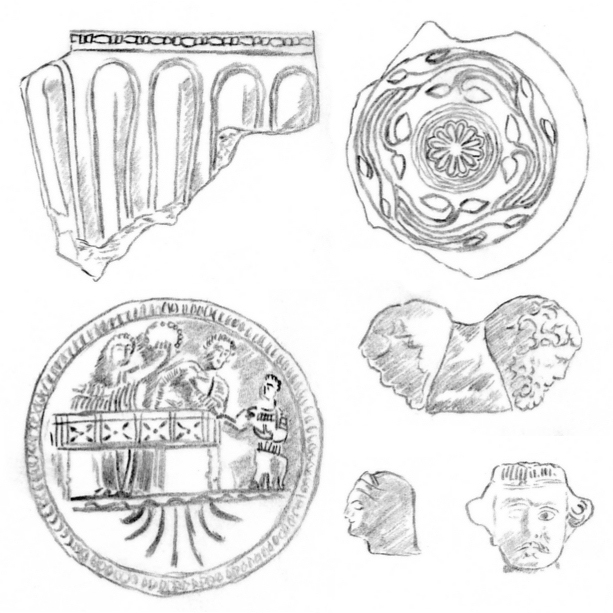
Main archaeological artifacts from the Indo-Greek strata at Taxila. From top, left: *Fluted vase with bead and reel design (Bhir Mound, stratum 1) *Cup with rosace and decorative scroll (Bhir Mound, stratum 1) *Stone palette with individual on a couch being crowned by standing woman, and served (Sirkap, stratum 5) *Handle with double depiction of a philosopher (Sirkap, stratum 5/4) *Woman with smile (Sirkap, stratum 5) *Man with moustache (Sirkap, stratum 5) (Source: John Marshall "Taxila, Archaeological excavations").

The site of Sirkap was built according to the "Hippodamian" grid-plan characteristic of Greek cities. It is organized around one main avenue and fifteen perpendicular streets, covering a surface of around 1,200 by 400 meters (3,900 ft × 1,300 ft), with a surrounding wall 5–7 meters (16–23 ft) wide and 4.8 kilometers (3.0 mi) long. The ruins are Greek in character, similar to those of Olynthus in Macedonia.

Numerous Hellenistic artifacts have been found, in particular coins of Greco-Bactrian kings and stone palettes representing Greek mythological scenes. Some of them are purely Hellenistic, others indicate an evolution of the Greco-Bactrian styles found at Ai-Khanoum towards more indianized styles. For example, accessories such as Indian ankle bracelets can be found on some representations of Greek mythological figures such as Artemis.

Following its construction by the Greeks, the city was further rebuilt during the incursions of the Indo-Scythians, and later by the Indo-Parthians after an earthquake in 30 AD. Gondophares, the first king of the Indo-Parthian Kingdom, built parts of the city including the double headed eagle stupa and the temple of the sun god. The city was overtaken by the Kushan kings who abandoned it and built a new city at Sirsukh, about 1.5 km (0.93 mi) to the north-east.

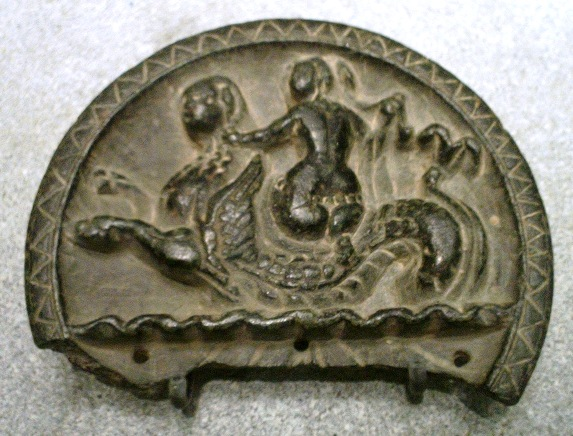
A Nereid riding a Ketos sea-monster, stone palette, Sirkap, 2nd century BC.

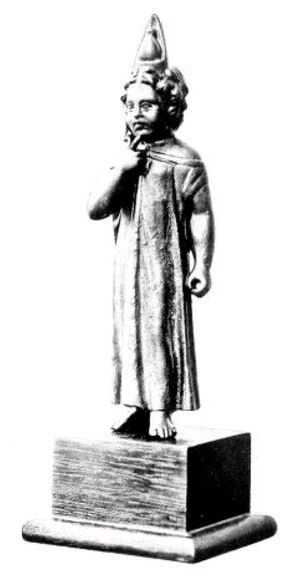
Harpocrates, Late Hellenistic, Sirkap.

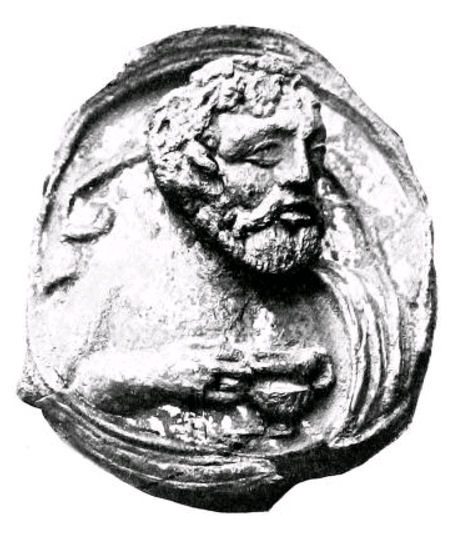
Head of Dionysus, Sirkap

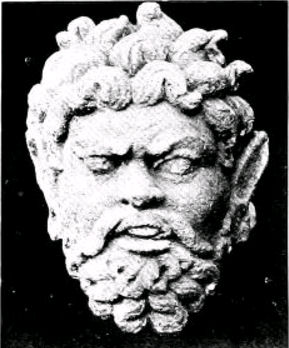
Dionysus, Sirkap.

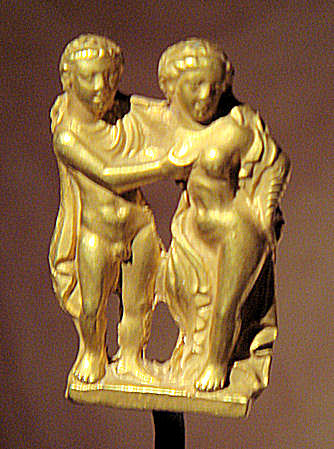
Statue of a Hellenistic couple, Sirkap.

== Religious buildings ==
Buddhist stupas with strong Hellenistic decorative elements can be found throughout the Sirkap site (Stupa of the two eagles indicating a close interaction of religious cultures. A Greek religious temple of the Ionic order is also visible at the nearby site of Jandial (650 meters (2,130 ft) from Sirkap), but there is a possibility that it may have been dedicated to a Zoroastrian cult. A temple of Buddhist goddess Hariti with hellenistic decoration was also found.

The site of Sirkap bears witness to the city-building activity of the Indo-Greeks during their occupation of the Indian territory for close to two centuries, as well as their integration of other faiths, especially Buddhism.

=== Round stupa ===
One round Stupa is present at Sirkap. It is one of the oldest Stupas in the Indian-Subcontinent. It is assumed that this Stupa was uprooted and thrown to its present location by a strong earthquake in the 1st century AD. When the new city was built later, the Stupa was kept by building a protecting wall around it.

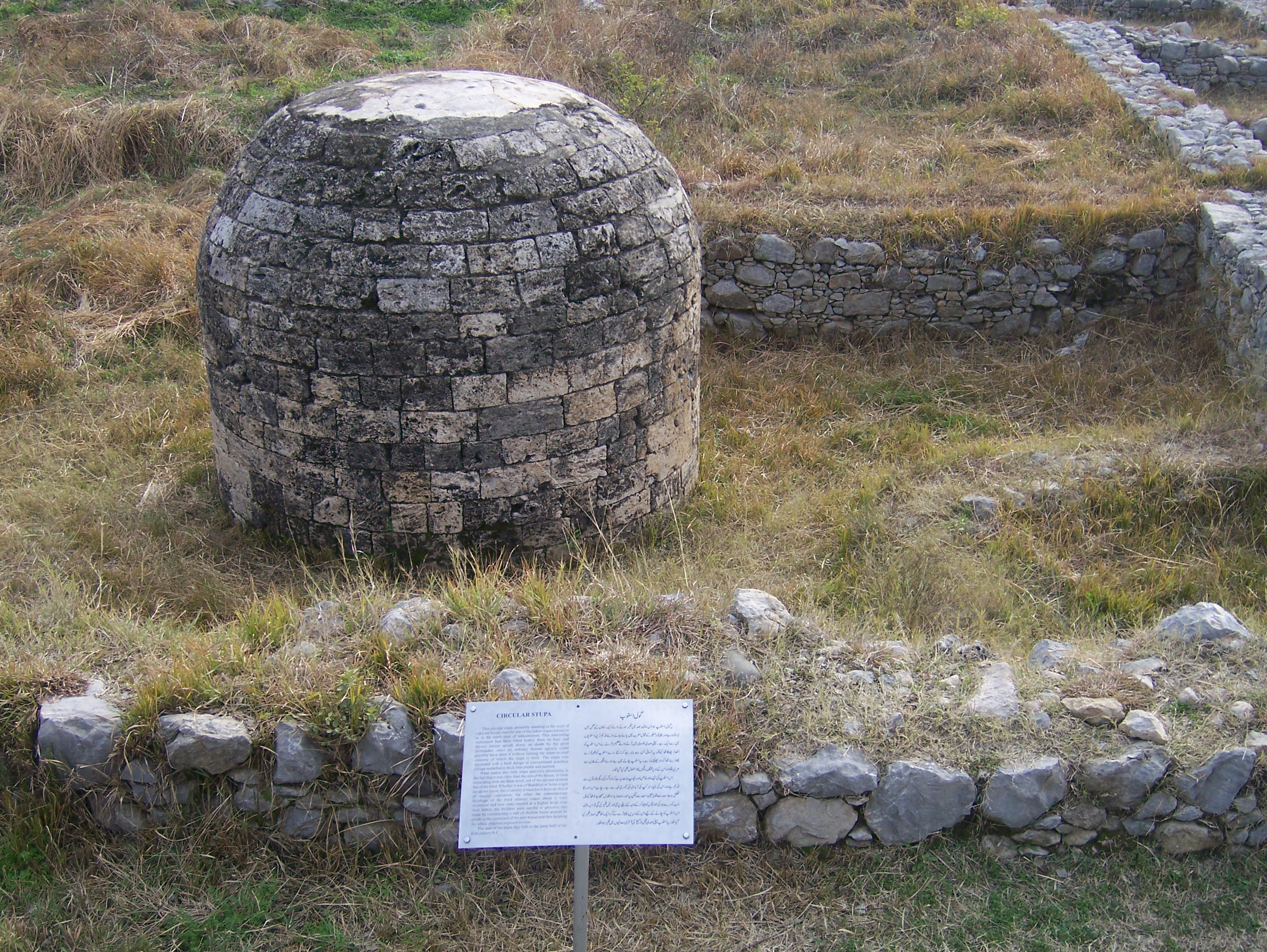
The round Stupa at Sirkap.

=== Apsidal Temple ===
The building that is known as the Apsidal Temple is the largest sanctuary of Sirkap, measuring about 70 by 40 meters (230 by 130 ft) (by contrast: the Parthenon in Athens is 70 by 31 meters (230 by 102 ft)). The Apsidal Temple consists of a square nave with several rooms, used by the Buddhist monks, and a circular room, which gives the building its apsidal shape. After the earthquake that destroyed the city in c. 30 AD, the Buddhist shrine was built in a spacious courtyard. The round part was probably in use for a small stupa, but no traces of it remain. Some carvings were probably done by an artist from Greece.

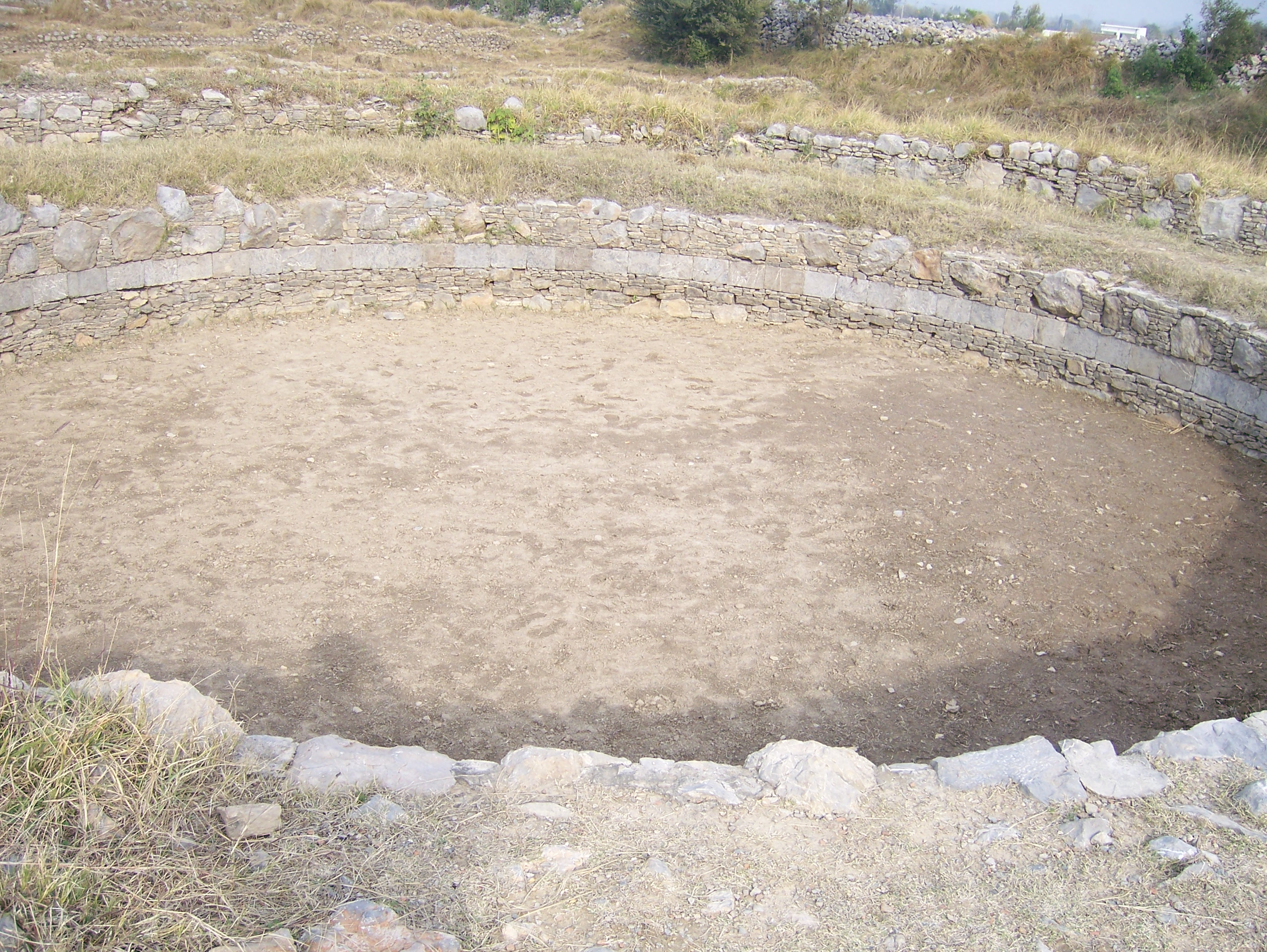
The round room of the Apsidal Temple.

=== Double-Headed Eagle Stupa ===
A special Stupa at Sirkap is the so-called 'Double-Headed Eagle Stupa'. The pilasters here are of a Greek design, "Corinthian columns". In the middle arch, a Greek temple is shown; in the outer, a shrine of a Hindu design can be seen. On top of these sanctuaries, a Double-headed eagle is seated from which the name of the Stupa has been derived. This motif is rather odd, to say the least, as it is originally Babylonian. It seems to have spread to Scythia, and introduced in the Punjab by the Saka rulers.

=== Dharmarajika Stupa ===
The nearby Dharmarajika Stupa, is a large stupa that dates from the 2nd century CE. The stupa was built to house relics of the Buddha, while several monastic buildings were built around the stupa.

== Visit by Apollonius of Tyana ==
The Greek philosopher Apollonius of Tyana is related to have visited ancient India, and specifically the city of Taxila in the 1st century AD. He describes constructions of the Greek type, probably referring to Sirkap:

"Taxila, they tell us, is about as big as Nineveh, and was fortified fairly well after the manner of Greek cities".

"I have already described the way in which the city is walled, but they say that it was divided up into narrow streets in the same irregular manner as in Athens, and that the houses were built in such a way that if you look at them from outside they had only one story, while if you went into one of them, you at once found subterranean chambers extending as far below the level of the earth as did the chambers above."

== Gallery ==
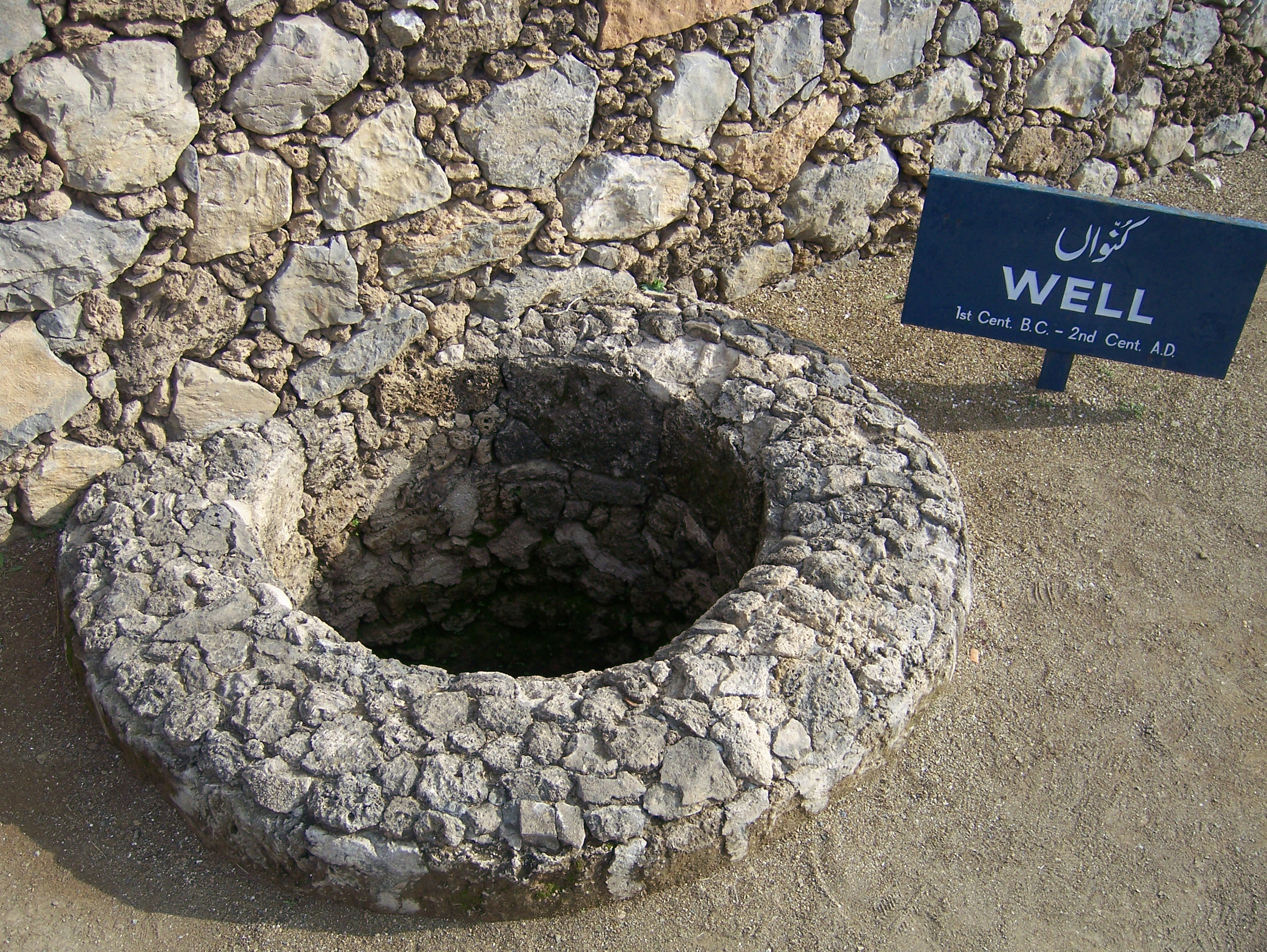
A well at Sirkap.

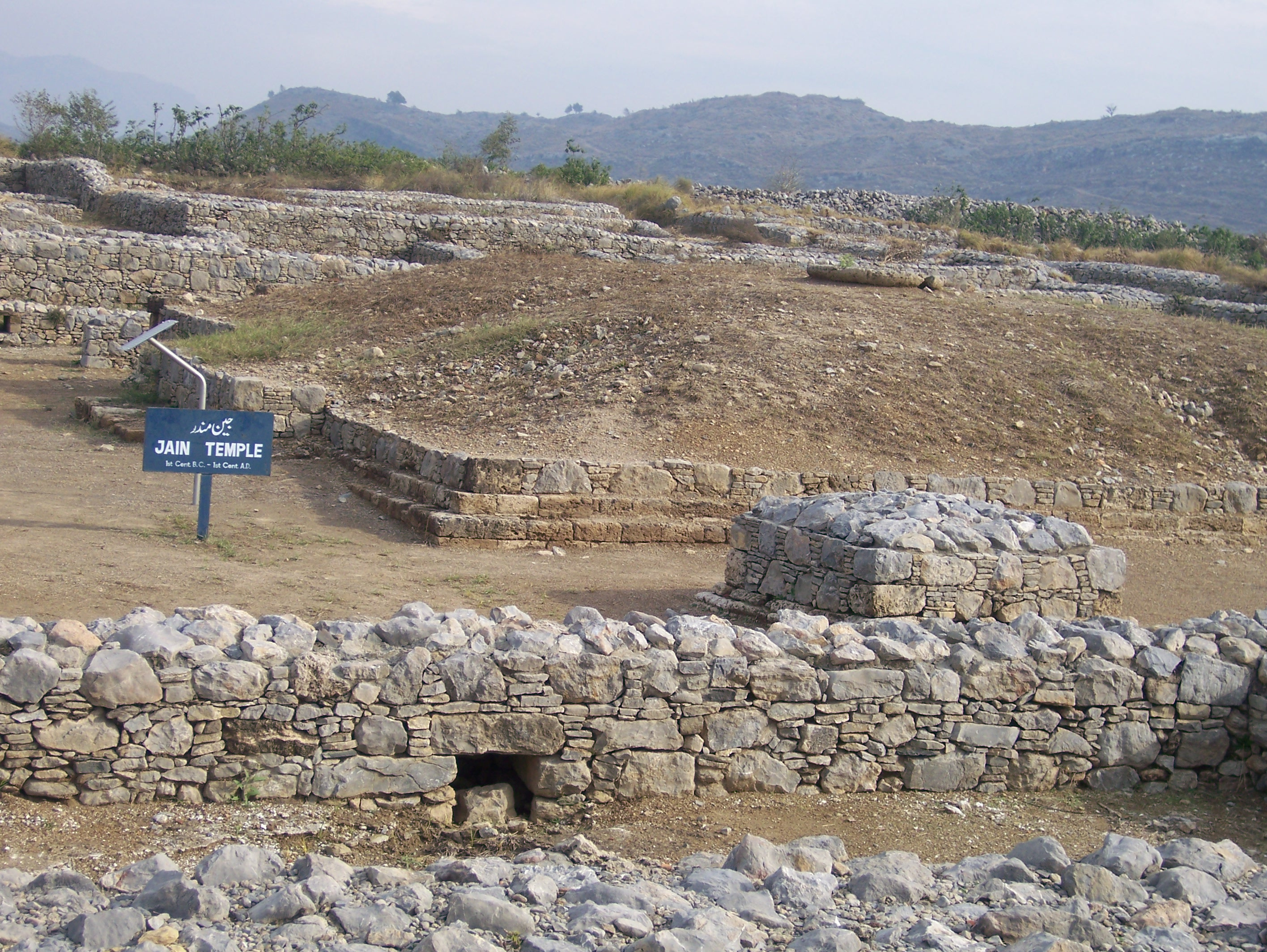
A Jain Temple at Sirkap.

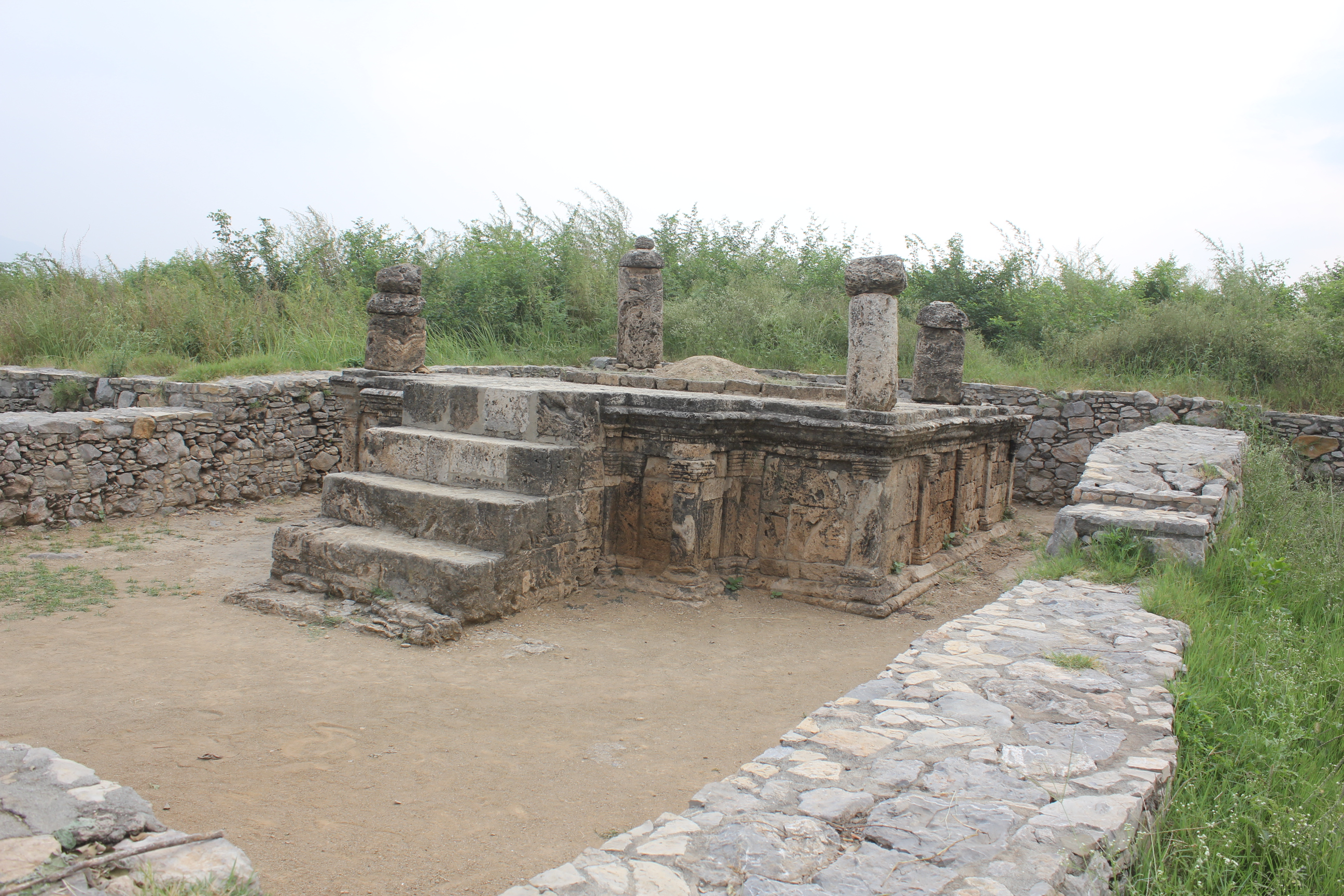
A possible Jain Stupa.

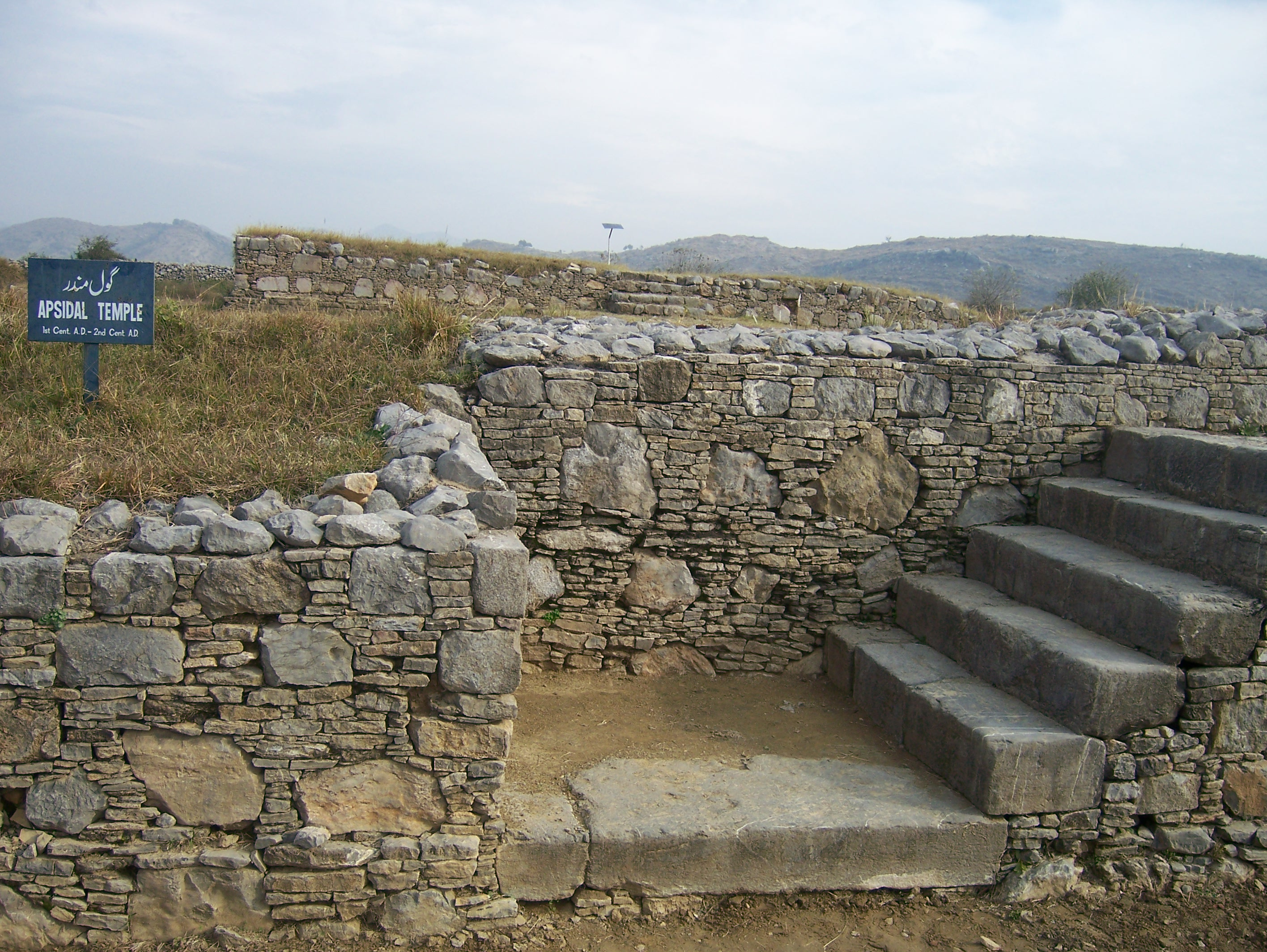
The Apsidal Temple at Sirkap.

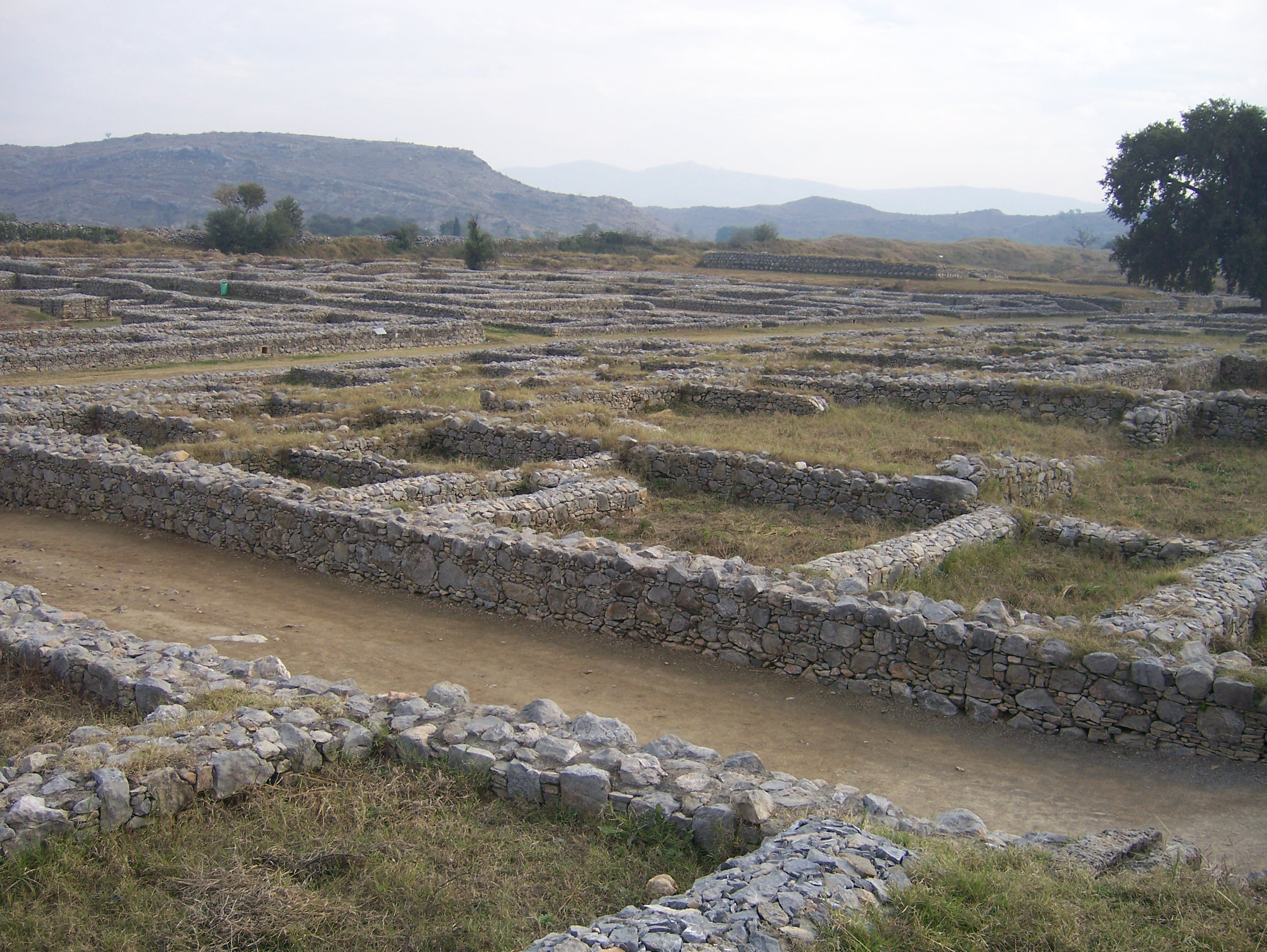
Streets of the Sirkap City.

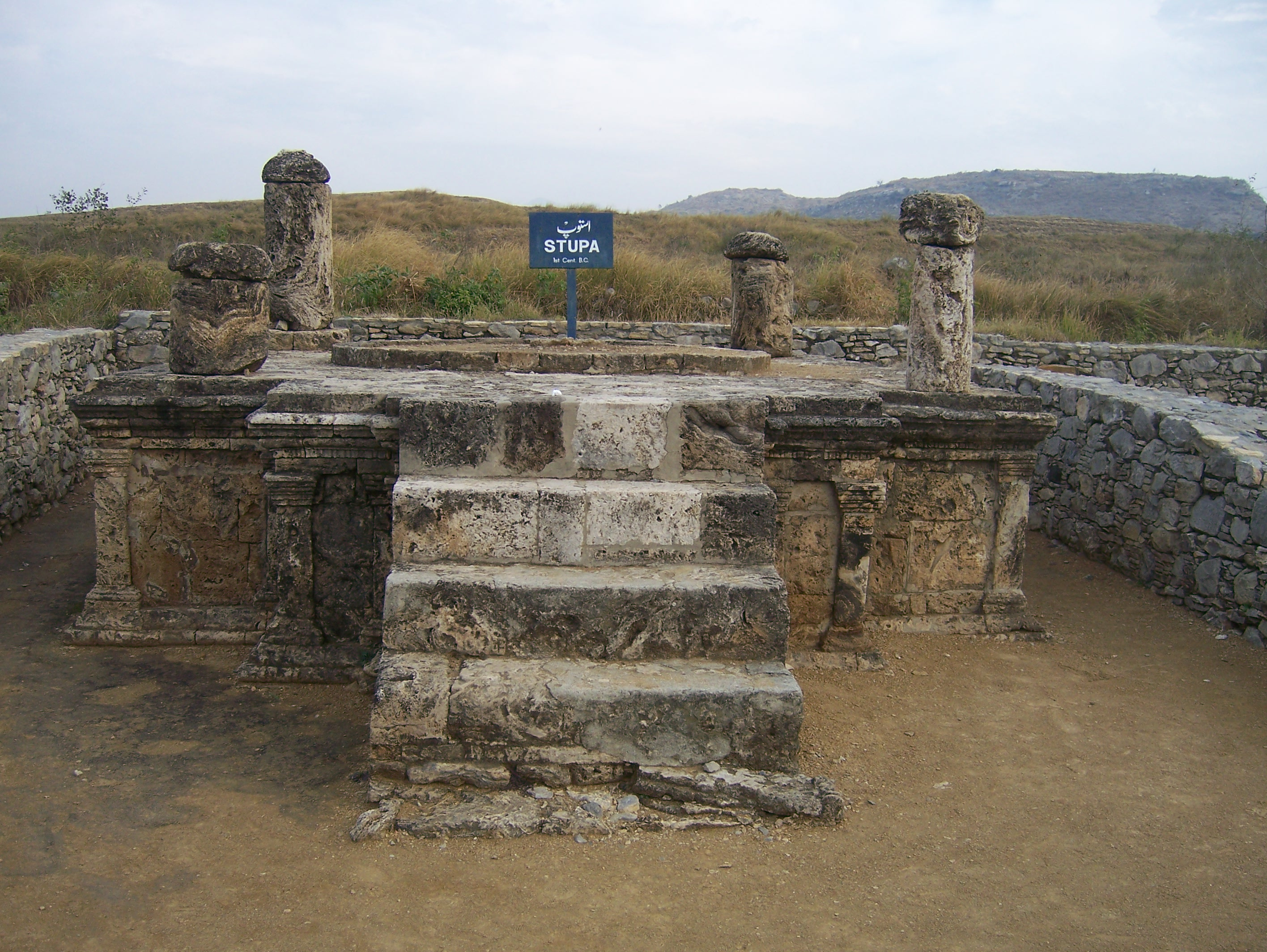
A Stupa from the 1st century BC.

== See also ==
- Bhir Mound
- Google Map images of the site
