= Demetriapolis =

Greek city in Arachosia

Demetriapolis (Ancient Greek: Δημητριάπολις) or Demetrias (Δημητριάς) was a Greek city in Arachosia, thought to have been founded by the Greco-Bactrian king Demetrius as he invaded areas south of the Hindu Kush. In the 1st century BCE in his "Parthian stations", Isidorus of Charax mentions the rule of the Parthians over Arachosia, an area south of the Hindu Kush and next to today's Afghanistan, and populated by Greek colonies:

"Beyond is Arachosia. And the Parthians call this White India; there are the city of Biyt and the city of Pharsana and the city of Chorochoad and the city of Demetrias; then Alexandropolis, the metropolis of Arachosia; it is Greek, and by it flows the river Arachotus. As far as this place the land is under the rule of the Parthians." "Parthians stations", 1st century BCE

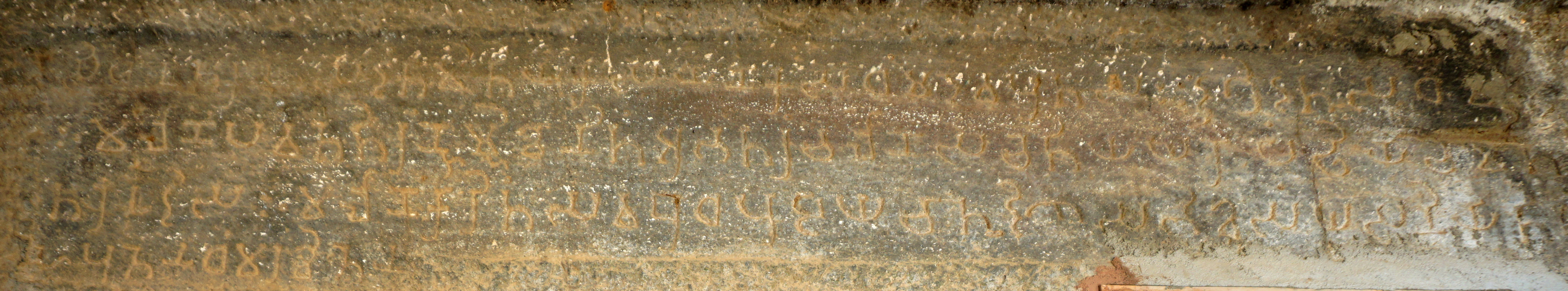
The "Yavana" inscription on the back wall of the veranda of Cave 17 in the Pandavleni Caves.

Demetrias may also be mentioned in the 2nd century CE inscription of Cave No.17 at the Pandavleni Caves. The inscription mentions the gift of the cave by Indragnidatta the son of the Yavana (i.e. Greek or Indo-Greek) Dharmadeva, a northerner from "Dattamittri". It is thought that the city of "Dattamittri" may be the city of Demetrias in Arachosia, mentioned by Isidore of Charax.

"Success! (The gift) of Indragnidatta, son of Dhammadeva, the Yavana, a northerner from Dattamittri. By him, inspired by true religion, this cave has been caused to be excavated in mount Tiranhu, and inside the cave a Chaitya and cisterns. This cave made for the sake of his father and mother has been, in order to honor all buddhas bestowed on the universal Samgha by monks together with his son Dhammarakhita."
