= Antimachus II =

Antimachus II Nikephoros "The Victorious"
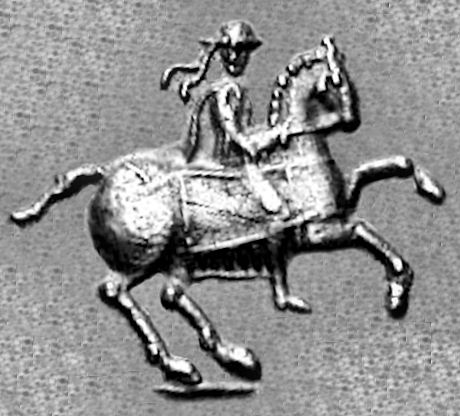
- Antimachus II on horseback

Indo-Greek king
- Reign: 174–165 BCE
- Predecessor: Antimachus I
- Successor: Menander I
- Dynasty: Euthydemid dynasty
- Father: Antimachus I or Demetrius II

Antimachus II Nikephoros (Greek: Ἀντίμαχος Β΄ ὁ Νικηφόρος; the epithet means "the Victorious") was an Indo-Greek king. He ruled a vast territory from the Hindu-Kush to the Punjab around 170 BCE. He was almost certainly the eponymous son of Antimachus I, who is known from a unique preserved tax receipt. Osmund Bopearachchi dated Antimachus II to 160–155 BCE on numismatical grounds, but changed this to 174–165 BCE after the tax receipt was revealed to synchronise his reign with that of Antimachus I. R. C. Senior has not dated Antimachus II but thinks that his coins were possibly Indian issues of Antimachus I, despite their different epithets and coin types.

In both of Boperachchi's reconstructions, Antimachus II was succeeded by Menander I who inherited three of his four monograms. Antimachus II probably fought against the Greco-Bactrian king Eucratides I, who had dethroned his father in Bactria.

== Coins of Antimachus II ==
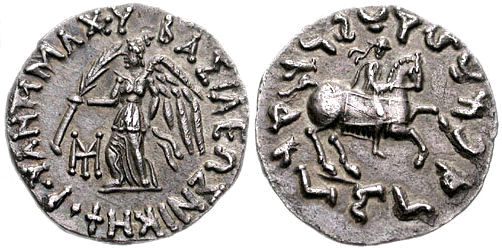
Drachma with Nike on the obverse and the Greek legend BASILEOS NIKEPHOROU ANTIMACHOU ("Kingship of the Victorious Antimachus"); on the reverse, filleted king on horseback, Kharoshti legend

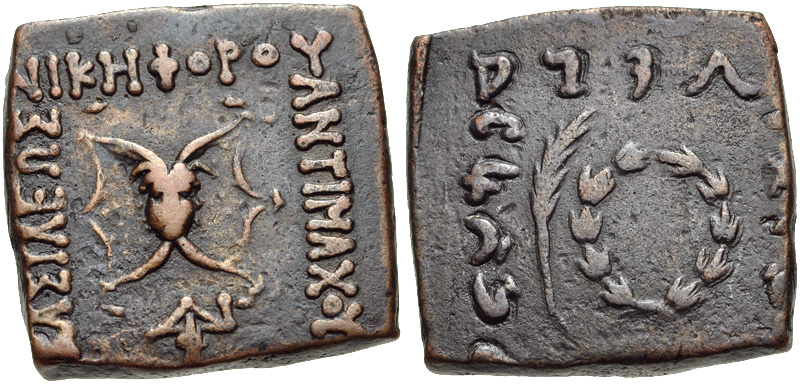
Bronze coin with the same Greek legend, and a gorgoneion within an aegis on the obverse; on the reverse a palm branch and victory wreath, Kharoshti lettering

Antimachus II did not strike a portrait on his coins, likely since this was not custom in India. Neither did the early kings strike tetradrachms. Antimachus II struck a large number of bilingual drachms on the same lighter Indian standard as Apollodotus I, though round in shape. On the obverse is Nike, and on the reverse a king on horseback.

He also issued bilingual bronzes with aegis / laurel wreath and palm. Both these and the goddess Nike seem to allude to his epithet "the Victorious".

== See also ==
- Greco-Buddhism
- Indo-Scythians

== Sources ==
- Rea, J. R.; Senior, R. C.; Hollis, A. S. (1994). "A Tax Receipt from Hellenistic Bactria" (PDF). Zeitschrift für Papyrologie und Epigraphik. 104: 261–280.
- Tarn, William Woodthorpe (1966). The Greeks in Bactria and India (3rd ed.). Cambridge: Cambridge University Press.
- "Sylloge Nummorum Graecorum 9", American Numismatic Society, New York, 1997.

Preceded by Apollodotus I (possibly)	Greco-bactrian King (in Paropamisadae, Arachosia, Gandhara, Punjab); 172 – 167 BCE	Succeeded by Menander I

	Greco-Bactrian kings		Indo-Greek kings					
Territories/ dates	West Bactria	East Bactria	Paropamisade	Arachosia	Gandhara	Western Punjab	Eastern Punjab	Mathura
326-325 BCE	Campaigns of Alexander the Great in India						Nanda Empire	
312 BCE	Creation of the Seleucid Empire						Creation of the Maurya Empire	
305 BCE	Seleucid Empire after Mauryan war		Maurya Empire					
280 BCE	Foundation of Ai-Khanoum							
255–239 BCE	Independence of the Greco-Bactrian kingdom Diodotus I		Emperor Ashoka (268-232 BCE)					
239–223 BCE	Diodotus II							
230–200 BCE	Euthydemus I							
200–190 BCE	Demetrius I				Sunga Empire			
190-185 BCE	Euthydemus II							
190–180 BCE	Agathocles			Pantaleon				
185–170 BCE	Antimachus I							
180–160 BCE			Apollodotus I					
175–170 BCE	Demetrius II							
160–155 BCE			Antimachus II					
170–145 BCE	Eucratides I							
155–130 BCE	Yuezhi occupation, loss of Ai-Khanoum	Eucratides II; Plato; Heliocles I	Menander I					
130–120 BCE	Yuezhi occupation		Zoilus I		Agathoclea			Yavanarajya inscription
120–110 BCE			Lysias		Strato I			Yavanarajya inscription
110–100 BCE			Antialcidas		Heliocles II			Yavanarajya inscription
100 BCE			Polyxenus		Demetrius III			Yavanarajya inscription
100–95 BCE			Philoxenus					Yavanarajya inscription
95–90 BCE			Diomedes	Amyntas		Epander		Yavanarajya inscription
90 BCE			Theophilus	Peucolaus		Thraso		Yavanarajya inscription
90–85 BCE			Nicias	Menander II		Artemidorus		Yavanarajya inscription
90–70 BCE			Hermaeus	Archebius				Yavanarajya inscription
			Yuezhi occupation		Maues (Indo-Scythian)			
75–70 BCE				Vonones	Telephus	Apollodotus II		
65–55 BCE				Spalirises		Hippostratus	Dionysius	
55–35 BCE					Azes I (Indo-Scythians)		Zoilus II	
55–35 BCE					Vijayamitra/ Azilises		Apollophanes	
25 BCE – 10 CE				Gondophares	Zeionises	Kharahostes	Strato II; Strato III	
				Gondophares (Indo-Parthian)			Rajuvula (Indo-Scythian)	
			Kujula Kadphises (Kushan Empire)				Bhadayasa (Indo-Scythian)	Sodasa (Indo-Scythian)
