= Euthydemus II =

Graeco-Bactrian king in c. 200–180 BC

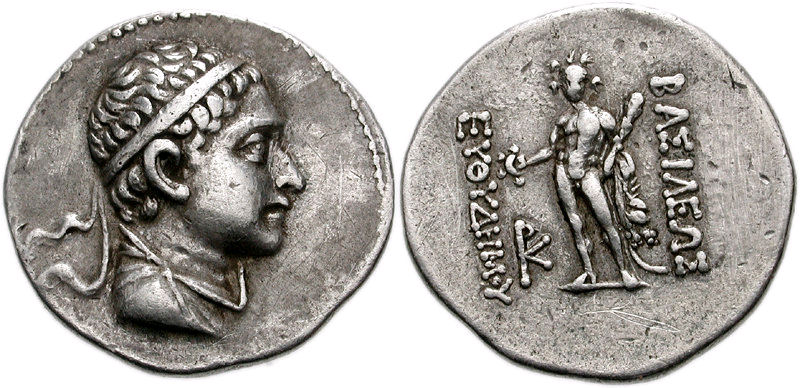
- Drachm of Euthydemus II (185–180 BC) with his portrait on the obverse wearing a diadem.
- Reign: c. 185–180 BC
- Predecessor: Demetrius I
- Successor: Eucratides I
- Born: c. 200 BC
- Died: c. 180 BC; Bactria
- House: Euthydemid dynasty
- Father: Demetrius I
- Mother: Daughter of Antiochus III and Laodice III

Euthydemus II (Greek: Εὐθύδημος, Euthýdēmos) was a Greco-Bactrian king who ruled in Bactria sometime between 190–180 BC.

== Rule ==
Son of Demetrius I of Bactria, Euthydemus II became king in the 180s BC, either after his father's death or as a sub-king to him. The style and rare nickel alloys of his coins associates him closely in time with the king Agathocles but their precise relation remains uncertain. Euthydemus is pictured as a boy on his coins and most likely died very young.

He was the last Euthydemid ruler of the Greco-Bactrian Kingdom and perhaps related with king Xiutu of Gansu.

== Gallery ==
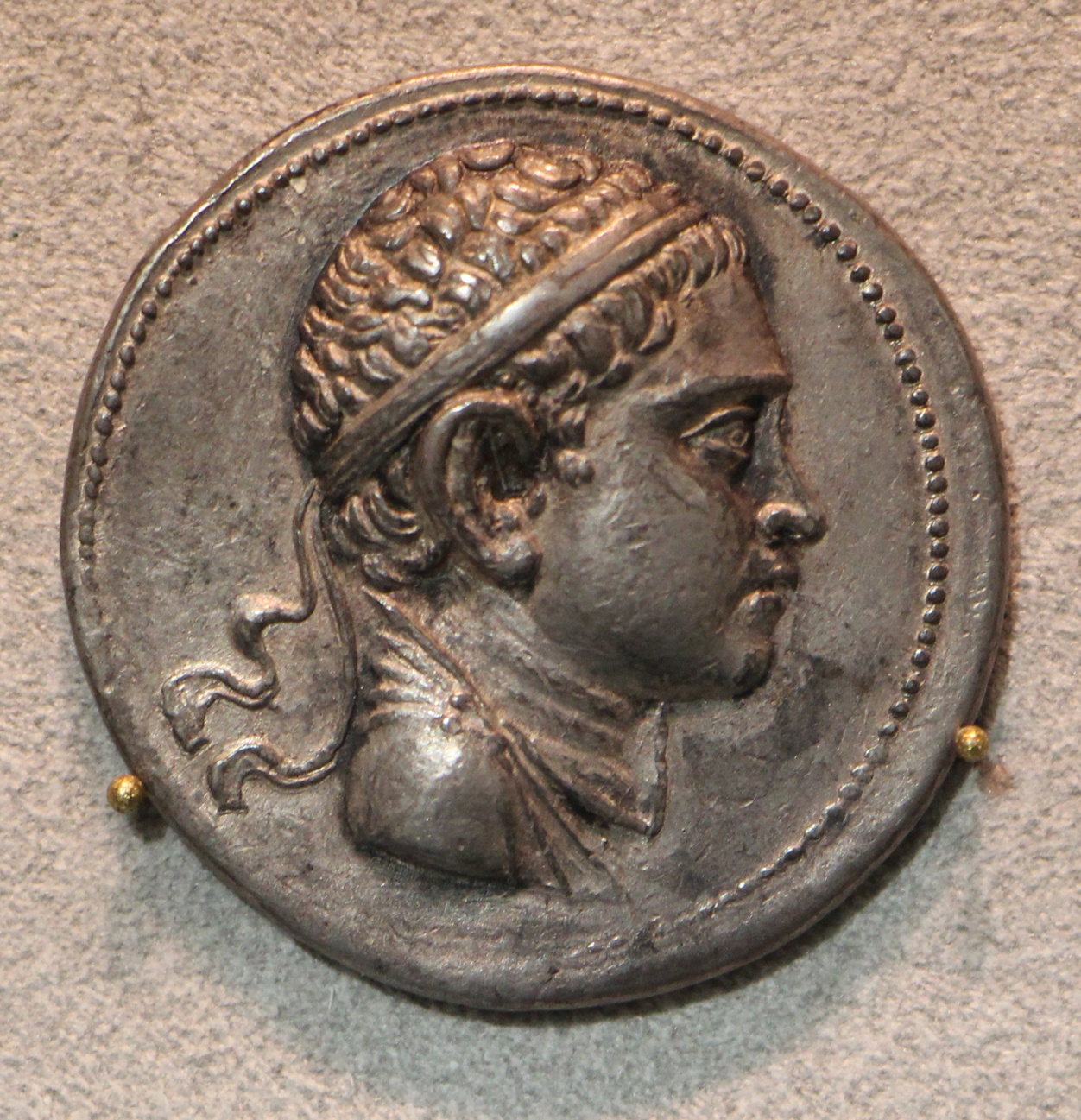
Tetradrachm of king Euthydemus II with obverse showing the young king wearing a royal diadem.

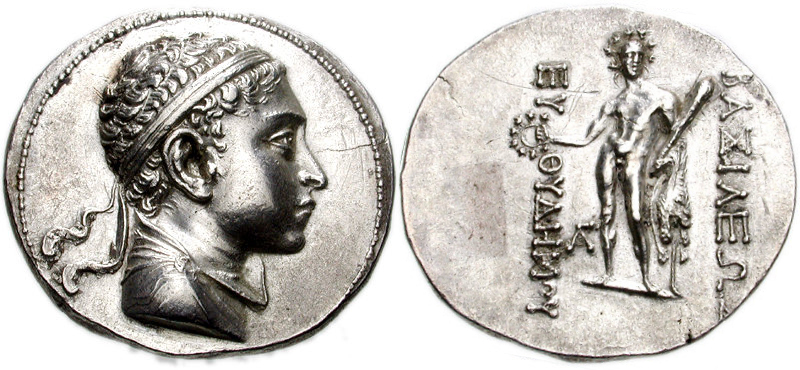
Silver coin of Euthydemus II. Reverse with standing Heracles holding club. Greek legend reads: ΒΑΣΙΛΕΩΣ ΕΥΘΥΔΗΜΟΥ, "Of King Euthydemus".

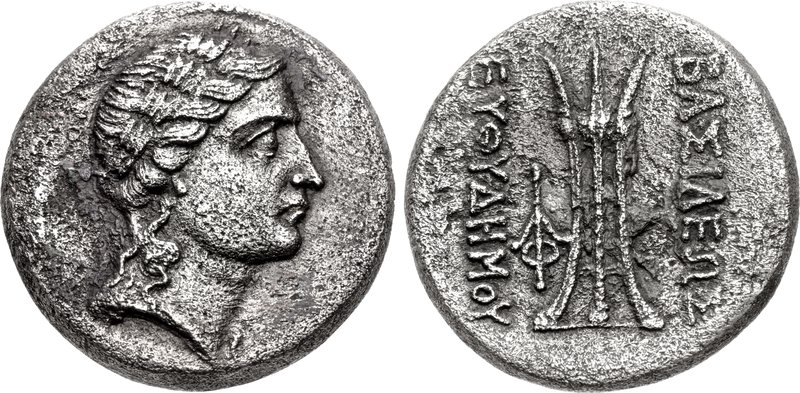
Cupro-nickel coin of Euthydemus II, c. 185–180 BC with Laureate head of Apollo, and Tripod on the reverse.

== See also ==
- Greco-Bactrian Kingdom
- Greco-Buddhism
- Indo-Parthian Kingdom
- Indo-Scythians
- Kushan Empire
- Seleucid Empire

== Notes ==
Preceded by Demetrius I	Greco-Bactrian king 180s BC	Succeeded by Agathocles

	Greco-Bactrian kings		Indo-Greek kings					
Territories/ dates	West Bactria	East Bactria	Paropamisade	Arachosia	Gandhara	Western Punjab	Eastern Punjab	Mathura
326-325 BCE	Campaigns of Alexander the Great in India						Nanda Empire	
312 BCE	Creation of the Seleucid Empire						Creation of the Maurya Empire	
305 BCE	Seleucid Empire after Mauryan war		Maurya Empire					
280 BCE	Foundation of Ai-Khanoum							
255–239 BCE	Independence of the Greco-Bactrian kingdom Diodotus I		Emperor Ashoka (268-232 BCE)					
239–223 BCE	Diodotus II							
230–200 BCE	Euthydemus I							
200–190 BCE	Demetrius I				Sunga Empire			
190-185 BCE	Euthydemus II							
190–180 BCE	Agathocles			Pantaleon				
185–170 BCE	Antimachus I							
180–160 BCE			Apollodotus I					
175–170 BCE	Demetrius II							
160–155 BCE			Antimachus II					
170–145 BCE	Eucratides I							
155–130 BCE	Yuezhi occupation, loss of Ai-Khanoum	Eucratides II; Plato; Heliocles I	Menander I					
130–120 BCE	Yuezhi occupation		Zoilus I		Agathoclea			Yavanarajya inscription
120–110 BCE			Lysias		Strato I			Yavanarajya inscription
110–100 BCE			Antialcidas		Heliocles II			Yavanarajya inscription
100 BCE			Polyxenus		Demetrius III			Yavanarajya inscription
100–95 BCE			Philoxenus					Yavanarajya inscription
95–90 BCE			Diomedes	Amyntas		Epander		Yavanarajya inscription
90 BCE			Theophilus	Peucolaus		Thraso		Yavanarajya inscription
90–85 BCE			Nicias	Menander II		Artemidorus		Yavanarajya inscription
90–70 BCE			Hermaeus	Archebius				Yavanarajya inscription
			Yuezhi occupation		Maues (Indo-Scythian)			
75–70 BCE				Vonones	Telephus	Apollodotus II		
65–55 BCE				Spalirises		Hippostratus	Dionysius	
55–35 BCE					Azes I (Indo-Scythians)		Zoilus II	
55–35 BCE					Vijayamitra/ Azilises		Apollophanes	
25 BCE – 10 CE				Gondophares	Zeionises	Kharahostes	Strato II; Strato III	
				Gondophares (Indo-Parthian)			Rajuvula (Indo-Scythian)	
			Kujula Kadphises (Kushan Empire)				Bhadayasa (Indo-Scythian)	Sodasa (Indo-Scythian)
