= Bharhut Yavana =

High relief of a warrior from Madhya Pradesh, India

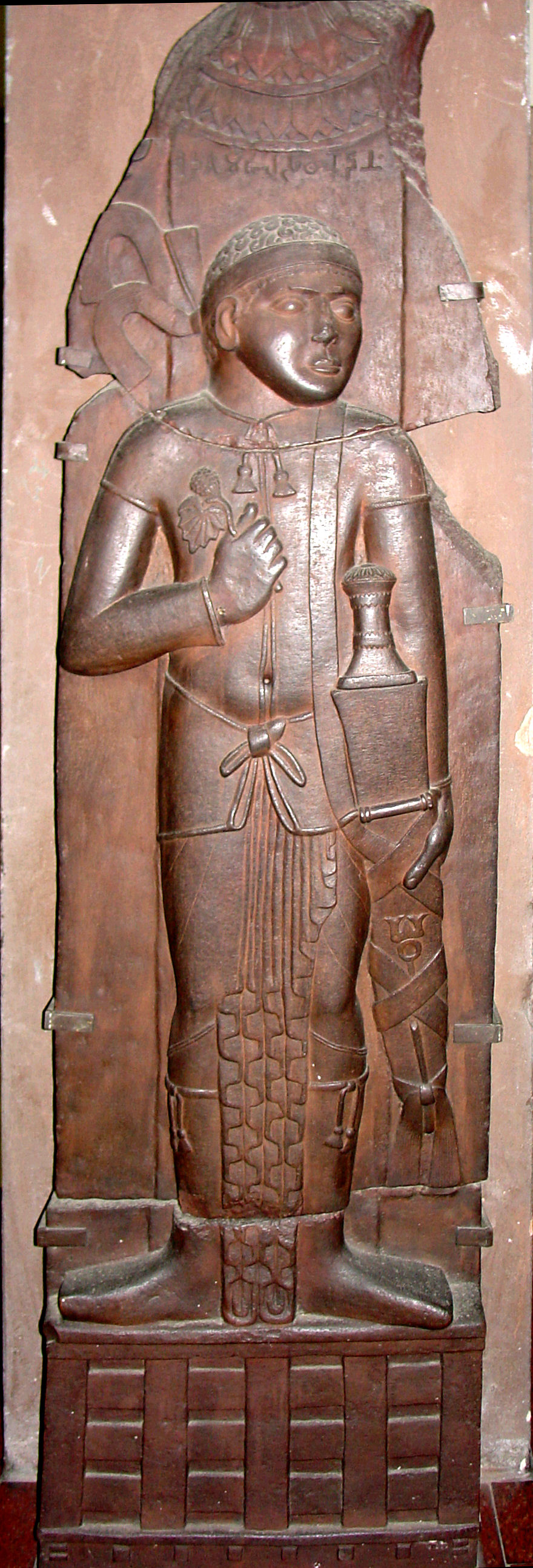
- The Bharhut Yavana.
- Material: Red sandstone
- Period/culture: c. 100 BCE
- Discovered: 24°27′00″N 80°55′00″E
- Place: Bharhut, India.
- Present location: Mathura Museum

The Bharhut Yavana is a high relief of a warrior which was discovered among the reliefs of the railings around the Bharhut Stupa. It is dated to circa 100 BCE, with a range from 150 BCE to 80 BCE. The relief is currently in the Indian Museum in Kolkata. The man in the relief has been described as a Greek, called "Yavanas" among the Indians.

== Characteristics ==
The role of the standing warrior is that of a dvarapala, deities who were Guardians of a temple gate.

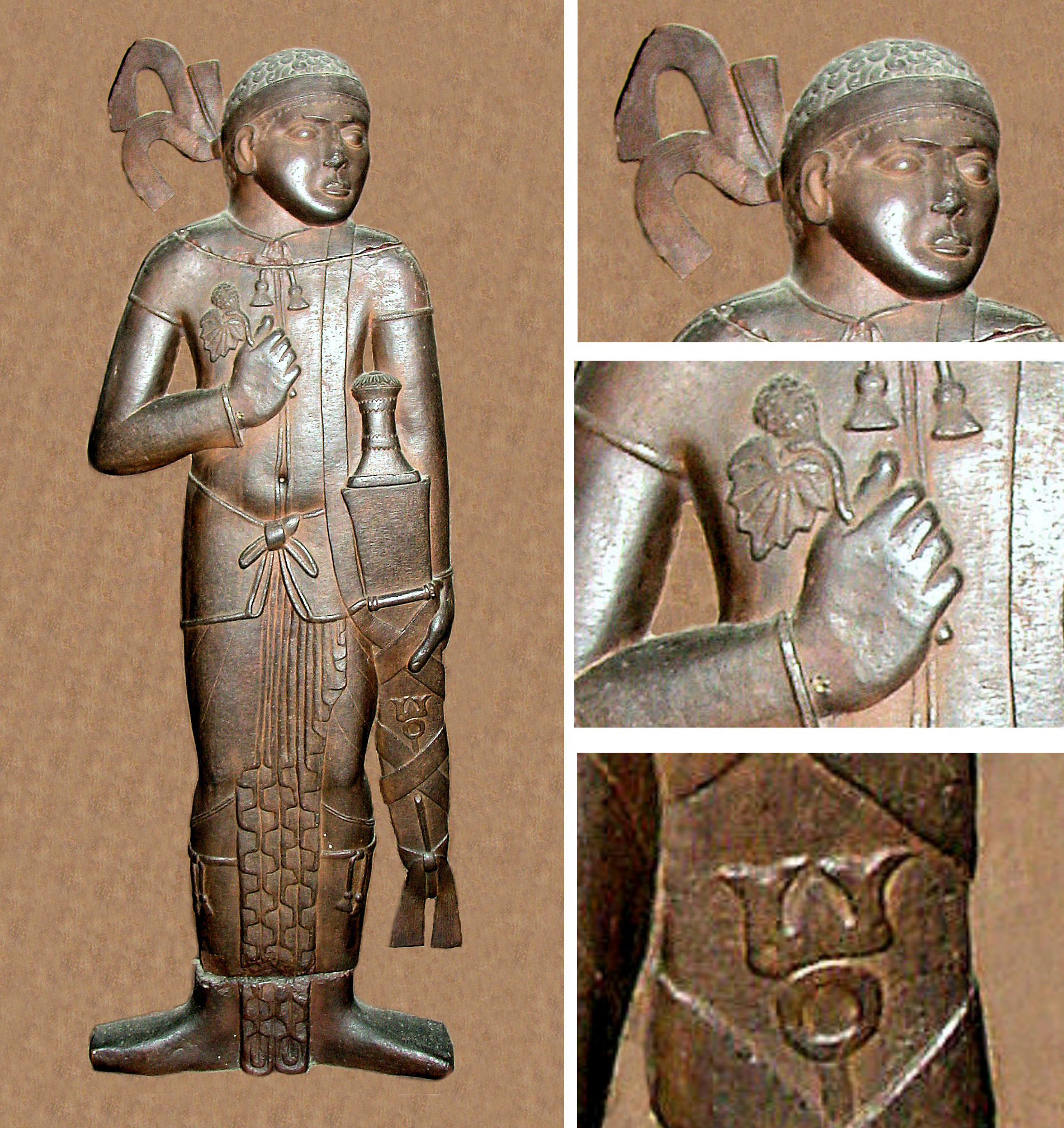
The Bharhut Yavana with details.

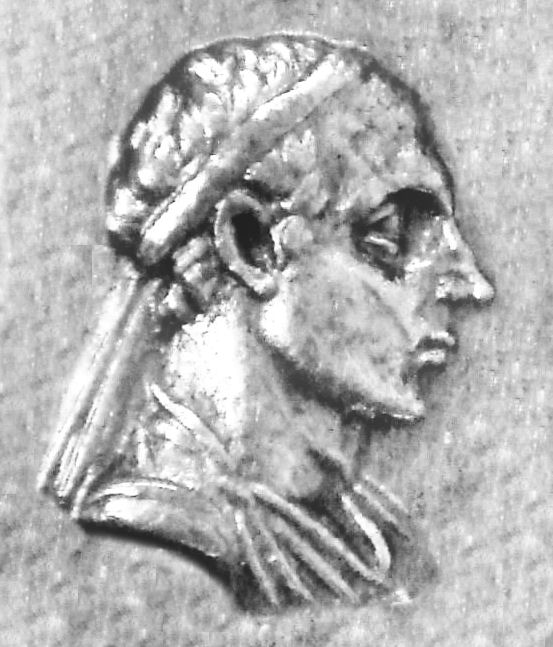
Portrait of Indo-Greek king Menander.

Many elements point to the depiction being that of a foreigner, and possibly an Indo-Greek, called a Yavana among the Indians of the period. Elements leading to this suggestion are the hairstyle (short curly hairstyle without an Indian turban), the hair band normally worn by Indo-Greek kings on their coins, the tunic, and boots. In his right hand he holds a grape plant, possibly emblematic of his origin. The sheath of his broadsword is decorated with a srivasta or nandipada, symbols of Buddhism.

He is holding in his right hand a vine, which could also be ivy.

This type of head with the band of a Greek king is also seen on reliefs at Sanchi, in which man in northern dress are seen riding horned and winged lions.

It has been suggested that the warrior is actually the Indo-Greek king Menander who may have conquered Indian territory as far as Pataliputra and is known through the Milinda Panha to have converted to Buddhism.

=== Inscription ===
The inscription at the top, classified as Inscription 55 in the Pillars of Railing of the SW Quadrant at Bharhut (The Stupa of Bharhut, Cunningham, p. 136 ), is in the Brahmi script and reads from left to right:

Inscription 55 in the Pillars of Railing of the SW Quadrant at Bharhut.

"Bhadanta Mahilasa thabho dânam"

"Pillar-gift of the lay brother Mahila."

— Inscription of the Bharhut Yavana

== Other instances of foreigners in Indian Temples ==
Besides this relief in Bharhut, devotees in Greek attire also appear in number at the Buddhist Stupa of Sanchi.

Some of them appear to be making a dedication to Southern Gateway of the Great Stupa. The official notice at Sanchi reads "Foreigners worshiping Stupa". The relief shows 18 of these foreigners and 4 Gandharva celestial deities in the sky above.

These have been called "Greek-looking foreigners" wearing Greek clothing complete with tunics, capes and sandals, typical of the Greek travelling costume, and using Greek and Central Asian musical instruments ( the double flute aulos, or the carnyx-like Cornu horns), possibly pointing to the Indo-Greeks. The men are depicted with short curly hair, often held together with a headband of the type commonly seen on Greek coins.

Three inscriptions are known from Yavana donors at Sanchi, the clearest of which reads "Setapathiyasa Yonasa danam" ("Gift of the Yona of Setapatha"), Setapatha being an uncertain city.

Around 113 BCE, Heliodorus, an ambassador of the Indo-Greek ruler Antialcidas, is known to have dedicated a pillar, the Heliodorus pillar, around 5 miles from Sanchi, in the village of Vidisha.

Northwestern foreigners at Sanchi
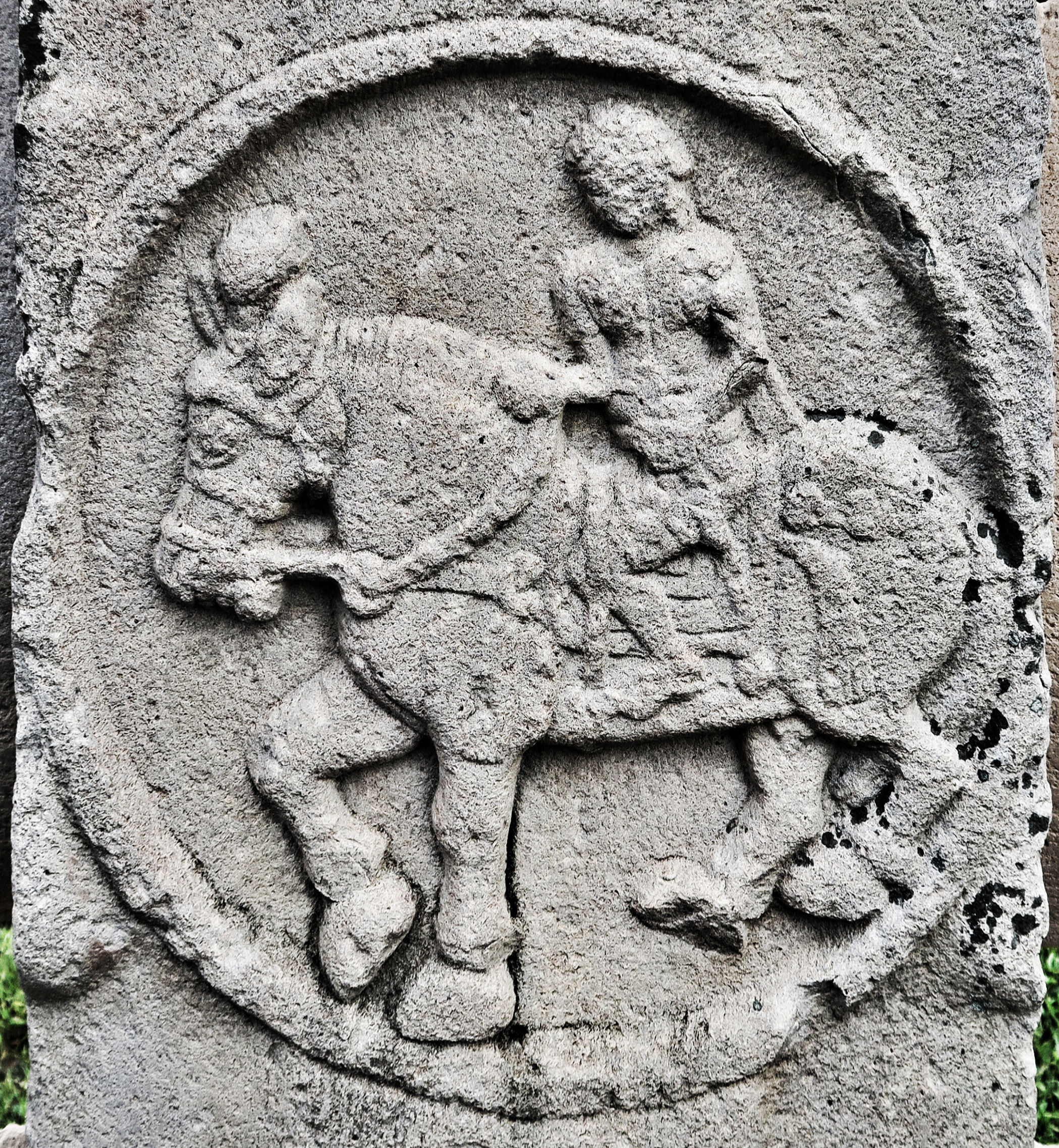
Foreigner on a horse, circa 115 BCE, Stupa No2.

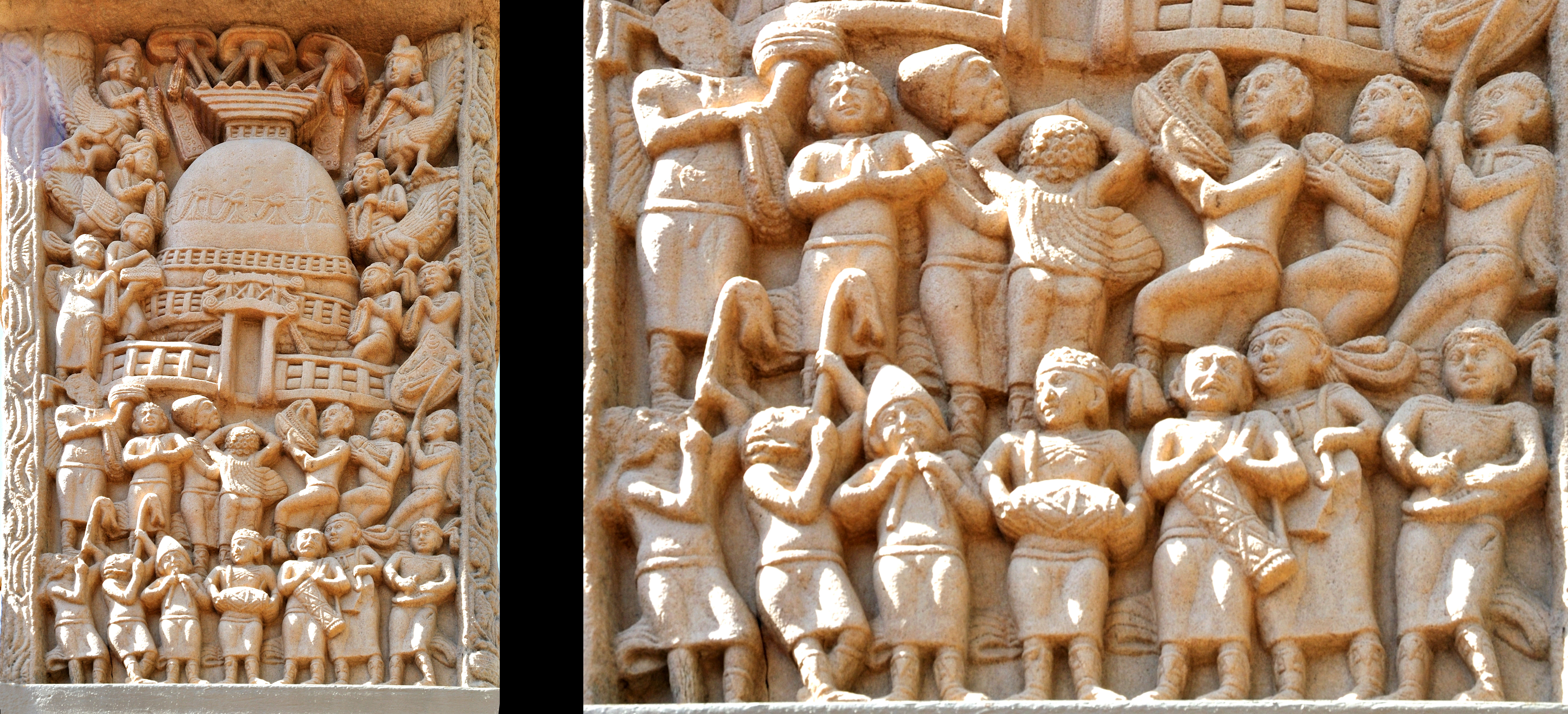
Foreign devotees and musicians on the Northern Gateway of Stupa I, circa 100 BCE.

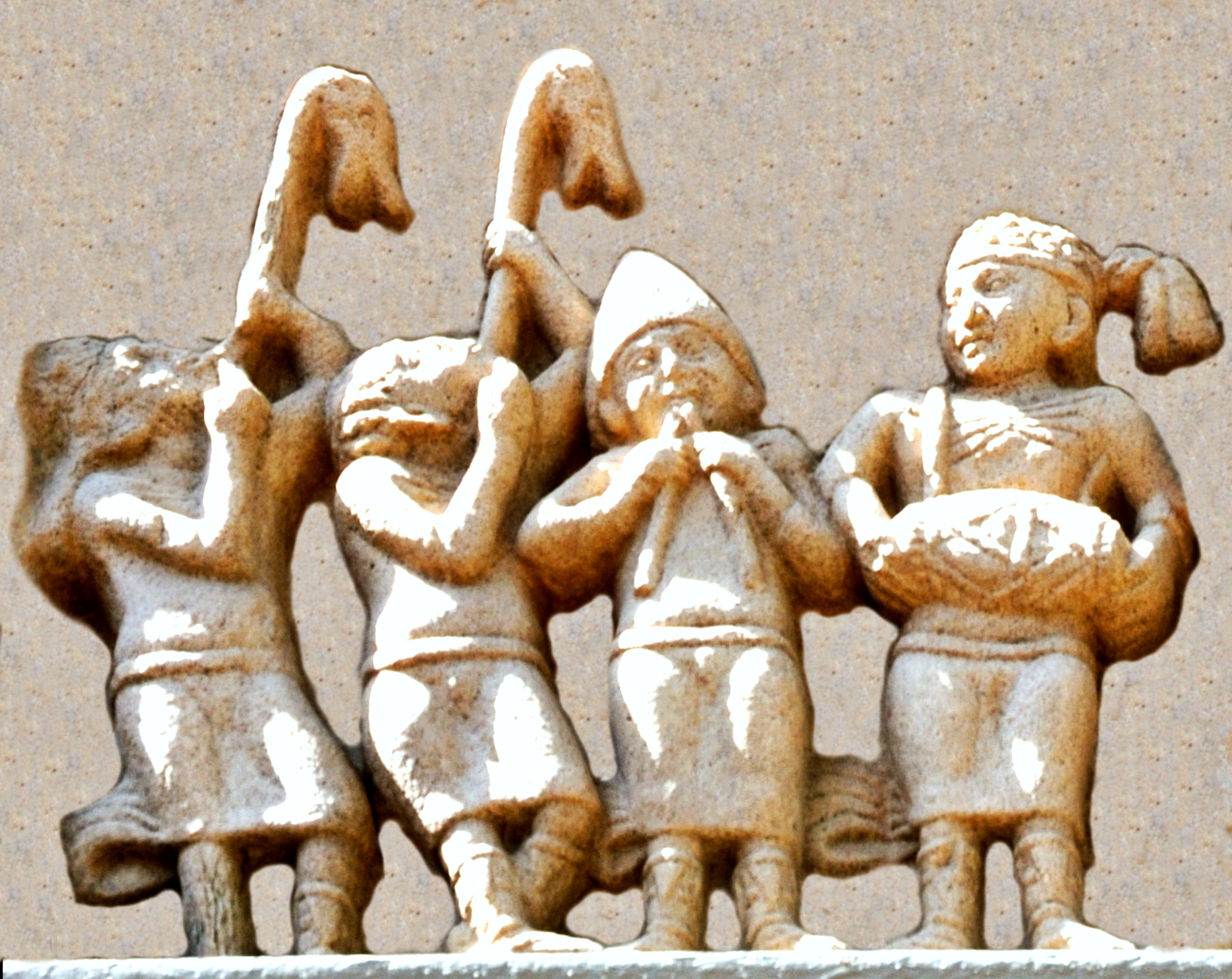
Detail of the foreigners, in Greek dress and playing carnyxes and aolus flute.

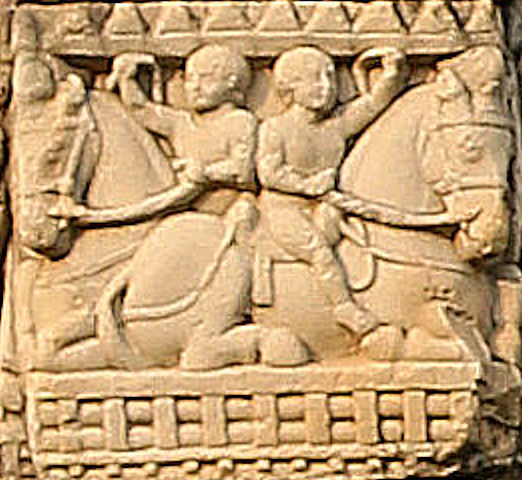
Foreign horseriders, Southern Gateway of Stupa 3.

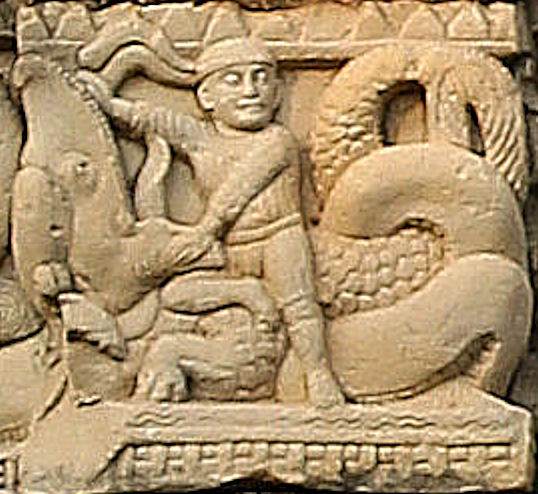
Foreigner with headband fighting a Makara. Torana of Stupa 3 in Sanchi.

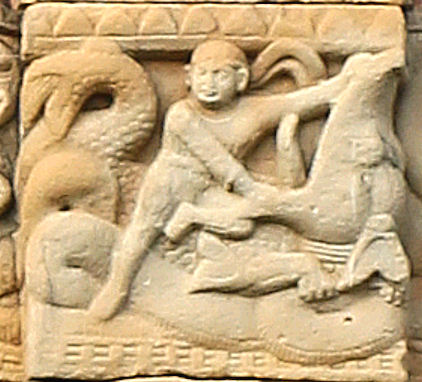
Hero with headband wrestling a Makara.

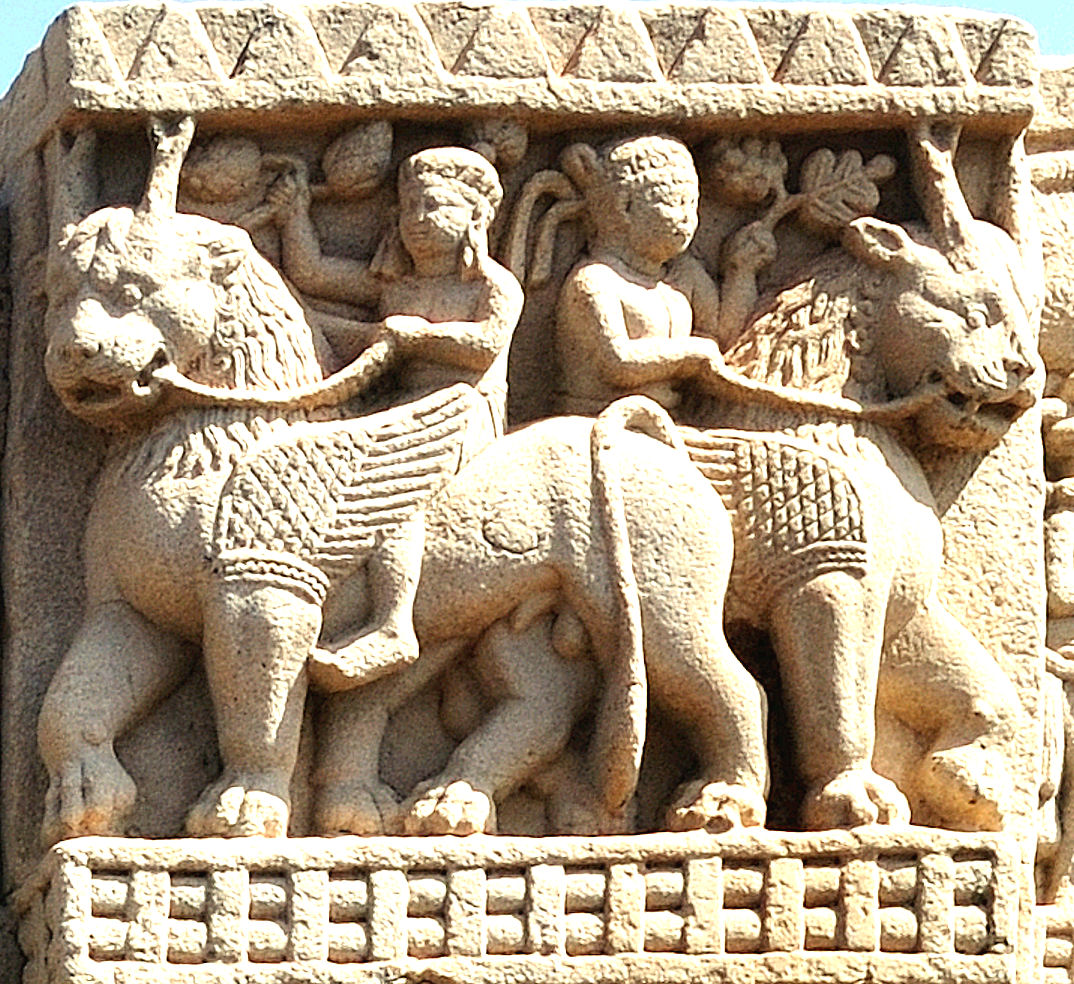
Foreigners holding grapes and riding winged lions, Sanchi Stupa 1, Eastern Gateway.
