= Bharhut =

Archeological site in Madhya Pradesh, India

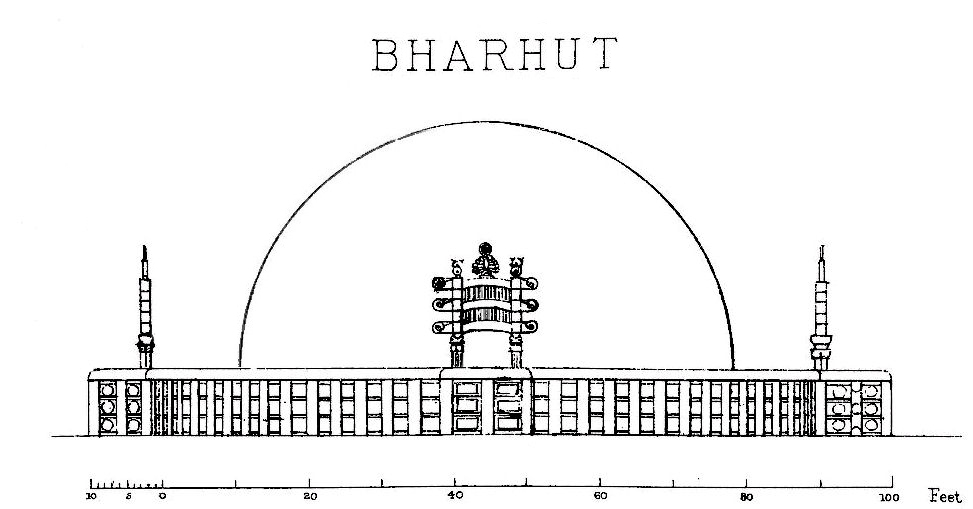
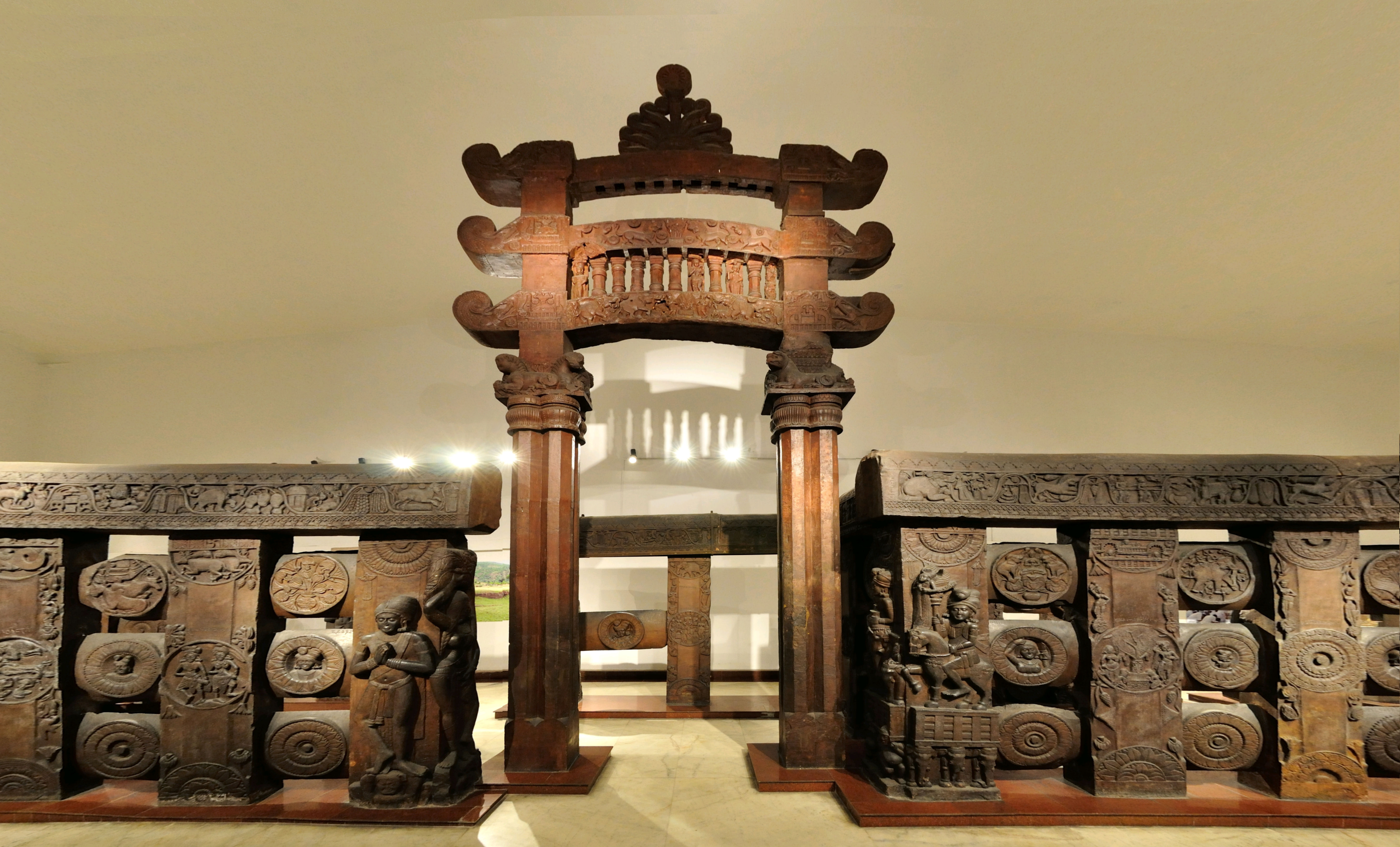
- Top: Original layout of the Bharhut stupa. Bottom: East Gateway and Railings, Red Sandstone, Bharhut Stupa, 125–75 BCE. Indian Museum, Kolkata.

- Location within India Location within Madhya Pradesh

Religion
- Affiliation: Buddhism
- District: Satna
- Region: Vindhya Range
- Ecclesiastical or organisational status: Stupa ruins present
- Year consecrated: 300–200 BCE
- Status: Artifacts Removed

Location
- Location: India
- State: Madhya Pradesh
- Coordinates: 24.446891°N 80.846041°E

Bharhut is a village in the Satna district of Madhya Pradesh, central India. It is known for a Buddhist stupa, unique in that each panel is explicitly labelled in Brahmi characters saying what the panel depicts. The major donor for the Bharhut stupa was King Dhanabhuti.

The Bharhut sculptures are some of the earliest examples of Indian and Buddhist art, later than the monumental art of Ashoka (c. 260 BCE), and slightly later than the early Shunga-period reliefs on railings at Sanchi Stupa No.2 (starting circa 115 BCE). It is more provincial in quality than the sculpture at Sanchi, Amaravati Stupa and some other sites, a large amount of sculpture has survived, generally in good condition. Recent authors date the reliefs of the railings of Bharhut circa 125–100 BCE, and clearly after Sanchi Stupa No.2, compared to which Bharhut has a much more developed iconography. The torana gateway was made slightly later than the railings, and is dated to 100–75 BCE. Historian Ajit Kumar gives a later date to Bharhut, the 1st century CE, based on stylistic comparisons with datable works of art from the Art of Mathura, particularly sculptures inscribed in the name of ruler Sodasa. Many of the Bharhut remains are now located in the Indian Museum in Kolkata, with others in museums in India and abroad. Little remains at the site today.

Buddhism survived in Bharhut until the 12th century. A small Buddhist temple was enlarged around 1100 AD and a new statue of Buddha was installed. A large Sanskrit inscription from the same period that was found at the site appears to have been lost. This is different from the Lal Pahad inscription of AD 1158 mentioning the Kalachiri kings.

Some recent reevaluations have tended to uncouple Bharhut from the Shunga period, and rather attribute the stupa to the 1st century CE, based on artistic similarities with better dated Mathura art and a questioning of the antiquity of the Bharhut inscriptions (particularly the Dhanabhuti inscriptions) suggested by traditional paleography.

== Bharhut stupa ==
=== Structure ===
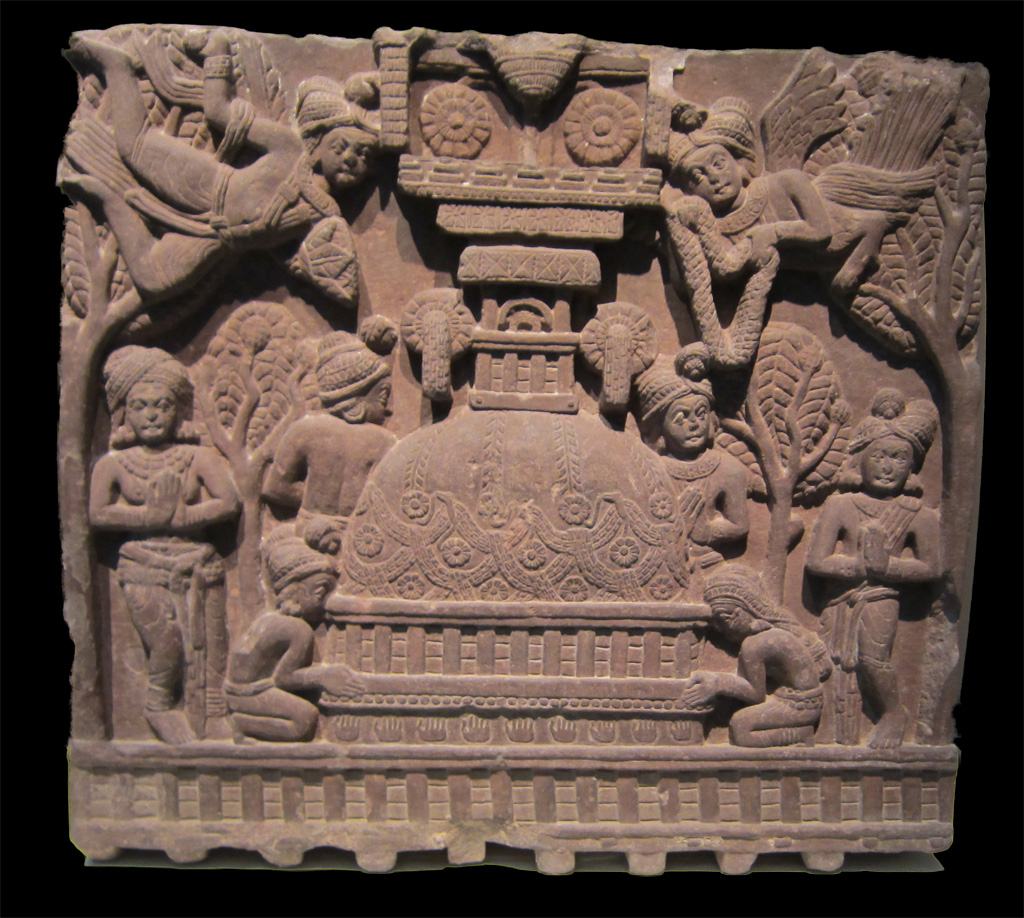
The Bharhut stupa, depicted on one of the friezes. Freer Gallery of Art

The Bharhut stupa may have been first built by the Maurya king Ashoka in the 3rd century BCE, but many works of art, particularly the gateway and railings, were apparently added during the Shunga period, with many reliefs from the 2nd century BCE, or later. Alternatively, the sculptures made have been added during the reign of the Sughanas, a northern Buddhist kingdom.

The central stupa was surrounded by a stone railing and four Torana gates, in an arrangement similar to that of Sanchi. A large part of the railing has been recovered, but only one of the four torana gates remains.

An epigraph on a pillar of the gateway of the stupa mentions its erection "during the rule of the Sugas by Vatsiputra Dhanabhuti". The expression used is "Suganam Raje", may mean "during the rule of the Shungas", although not without ambiguity as it could also be "during the rule of the Sughanas", a northern Buddhist kingdom. There is no other instance of the name "Shunga" in the epigraphical record of India. The inscription reads:

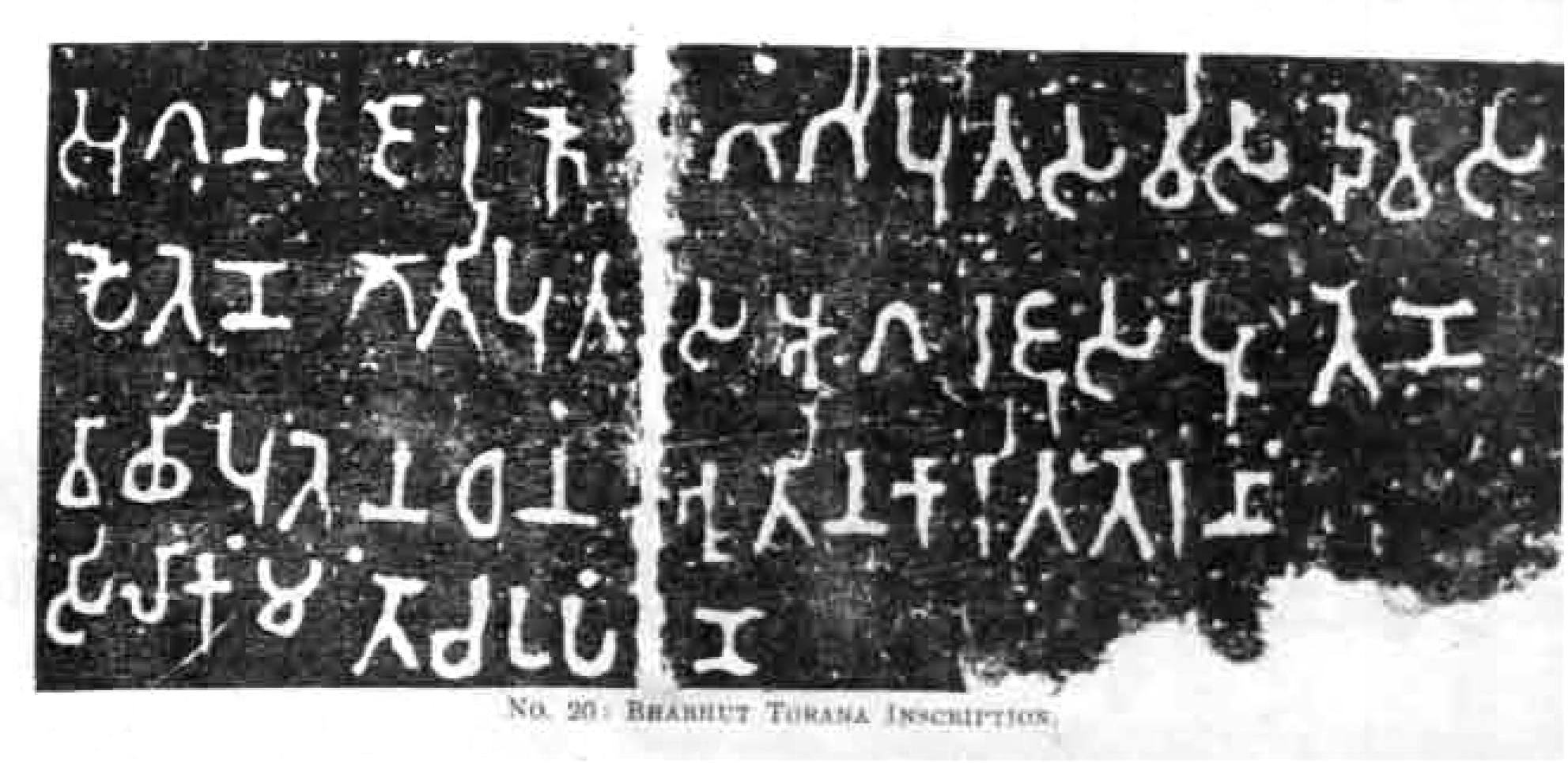
The Dhanabhuti inscription

1. Suganam raje raño Gāgīputasa Visadevasa
2. pautena, Gotiputasa Āgarajusa putena
3. Vāchhīputena Dhanabhūtina kāritam toranām
4. silākammamto cha upamno.

During the reign of the Sugas (Sughanas, or Shungas) the gateway was caused to be made and the stone-work presented by Dhanabhūti, the son of Vāchhī, son of Agaraju, the son of a Goti and grandson of king Visadeva, the son of Gāgī.

— Gateway pillar inscription of Dhanabhūti.

If the attribution is to be taken as "Shungas", since King Dhanabhuti was making a major dedication to a Buddhist monument, and on the contrary the Shungas are known to have been Hindu monarchs, it seems that Dhanabhuti himself was not a member of the Shunga dynasty. Neither is he known from Shunga regnal lists. His mention of "in the reign of the Shungas" also suggests that he was not himself a Shunga ruler, only that he may have been a tributary of the Shungas, or a ruler in a neighbouring territory, such as Kosala or Panchala.

=== Builders ===
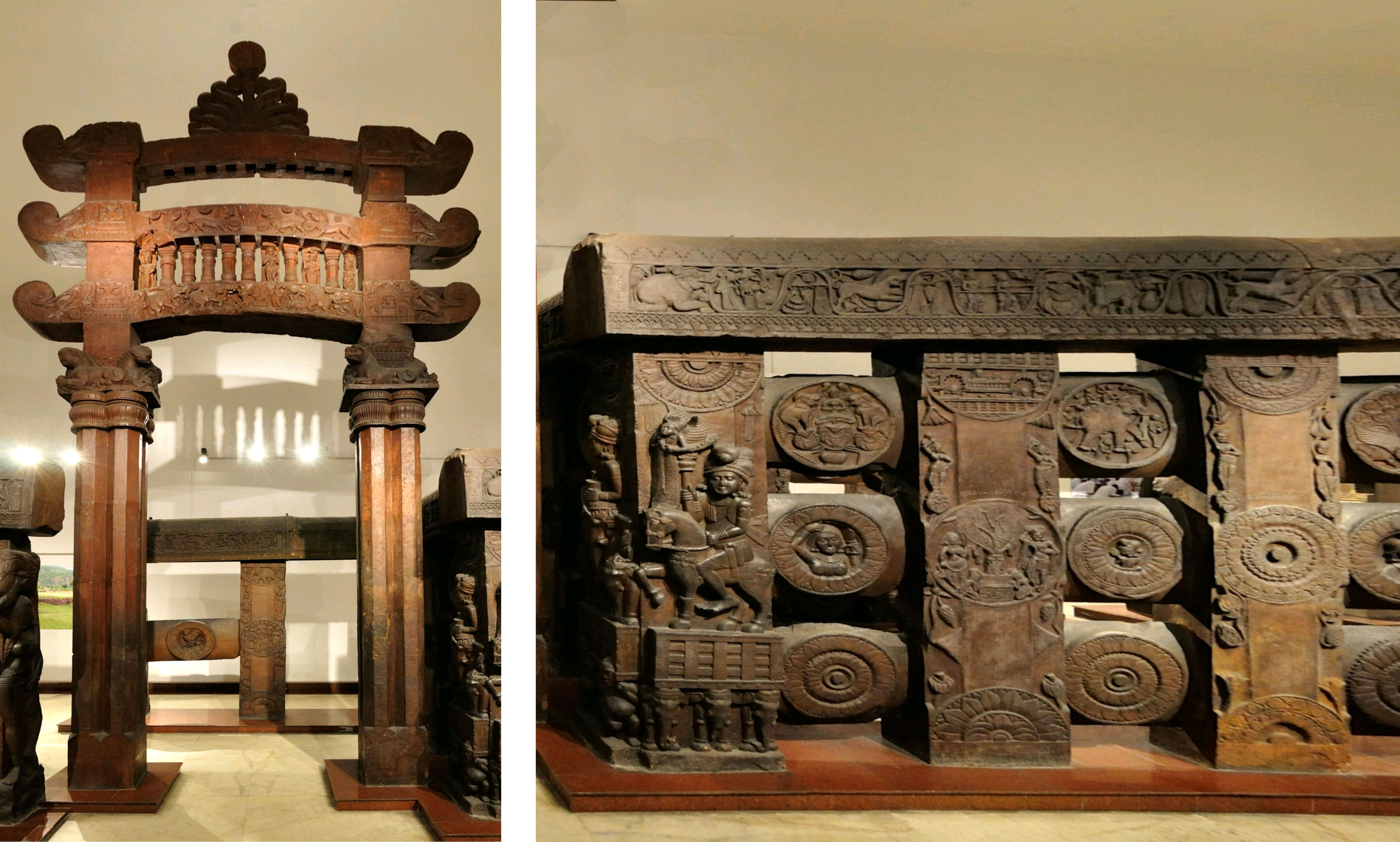
The gateways (left) were made by northern (probably Gandharan) masons using Kharosthi marks, while the railings (right) were made by masons using marks in the local Brahmi script.

Mason's marks in Kharosthi have been found on several elements of the Bharhut remains, indicating that some of the builders at least came from the north, particularly from Gandhara where the Kharoshti script was in use. Cunningham explained that the Kharosthi letters were found on the balustrades between the architraves of the gateway, but none on the railings which all had Indian markings, summarizing that the gateways, which are artistically more refined, must have been made by artists from the North, whereas the railings were made by local artists.

Kharosthi letters on the Eastern Gateway of Bharhut
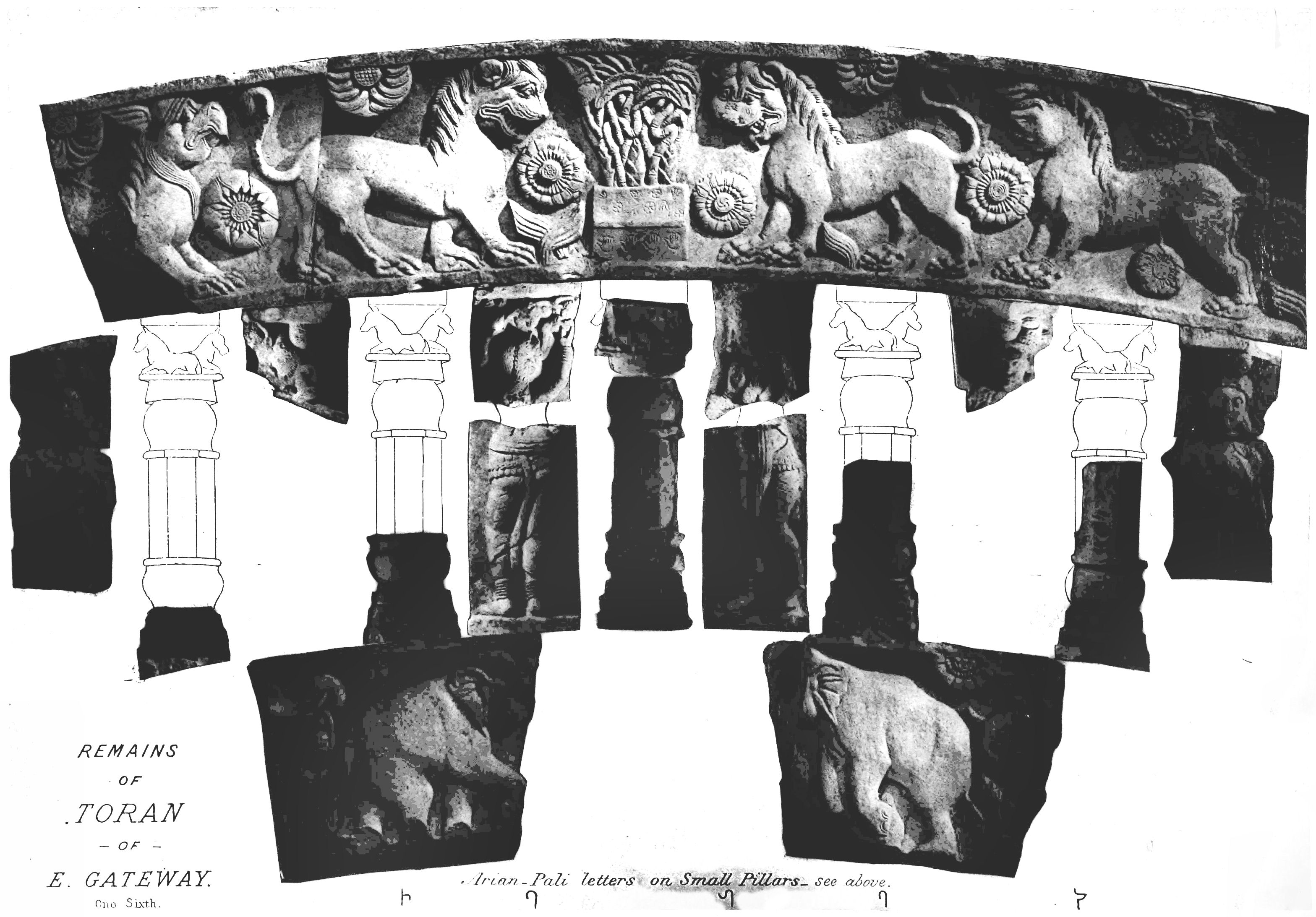
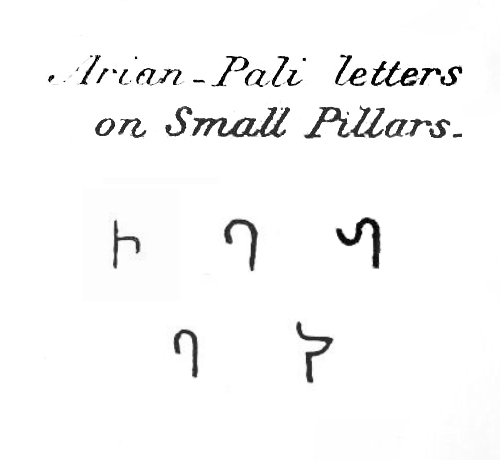
Kharoshthi (formerly called "Arian-Pali") mason's marks on the gateway. Five of the Kharosthi mason's marks (on a total of eight for the whole gateway) were discovered at the base of the small pillars of the gateway:
𐨤 pa, 𐨀 a, 𐨦 ba, 𐨯 sa

According to some authors, Hellenistic sculptors had some connection with Bharhut and Sanchi as well. The structure as a whole as well as various elements point to Hellenistic and other foreign influence, such as the fluted bell, addorsed capital of the Persepolitan order, and the abundant use of the Hellenistic flame palmette or honeysuckle motif. Besides the origin of its contributors however, the gateway retains a very strong Indian character in its form.

It would seem the railings were the first elements to be built, circa 125–100 BCE. The great gateway was built later, circa 100–75 BCE. On artistic grounds, the decorations of the railings are considered later stylistically than those of Sanchi Stupa No.2, suggesting a date of circa 100 BCE for the reliefs of the railings, and a date of 75 BCE for the gateway.

=== Excavation ===
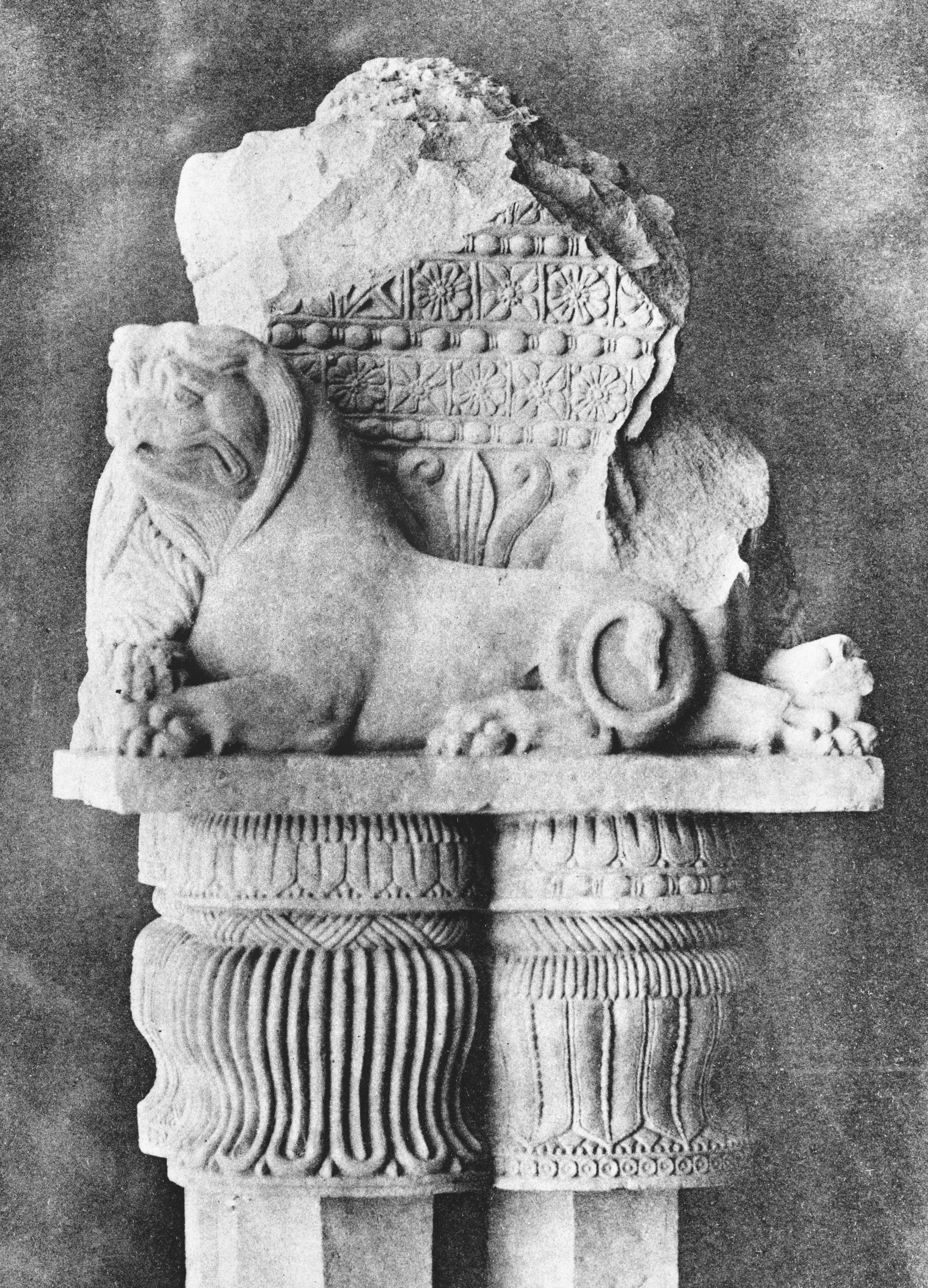
Bharhut pillar capital with rosette, beads-and-reels and flame palmette designs.

In 1873, Alexander Cunningham visited Bharhut. The next year, he excavated the site. Joseph David Beglar, Cunningham's assistant, continued the excavation and recorded the work through numerous photographs.

A pillar capital in Bharhut, dated to the 2nd century BCE during the Shunga Empire period, is an example of Bharhut architecture thought to incorporate Persian and Greek styles, with recumbent animal (in the style of the Pillars of Ashoka), and a central anta capital with many Hellenistic elements (rosettes, beads-and-reels), as well as a central palmette design, in a style similar to that of the Pataliputra capital.

The complex in Bharhut included a medieval temple (plate II), which contained a colossal figure of the Buddha, along with fragments of sculptures showing the Buddha with images of Brahma, Indra etc. Beglar also photographed a 10th-century Buddhist Sanskrit inscription, about which nothing is now known.

The ruined stupa—nothing but foundations of the main structure (see Gallery)—is still in Bharhut; however, the gateways and railings have been dismantled and reassembled at the Indian Museum, Kolkata. They contain numerous birth stories of the Buddha's previous lives, or Jataka tales. Many of them are in the shape of large, round medallions. Two of the panels are at the Freer Gallery of Art/Arthur M. Sackler Gallery in Washington. Some years ago a pre-Devanagari inscription, from the time of King Balaldev, was found on Bharhut mountain.

The sculptures and reliefs were removed by Alexander Cunningham and were being transported to London Museum for an exhibition on SS Indus from Clacutta to London via Colombo, Sri Lanka. However, the ship ran aground in 1885 near the town of Mullaitivu in northeastern Sri Lanka. The ship wreck was lost for more than a hundred years, being re-discovered in 2014.

== As representative of early Indian art ==
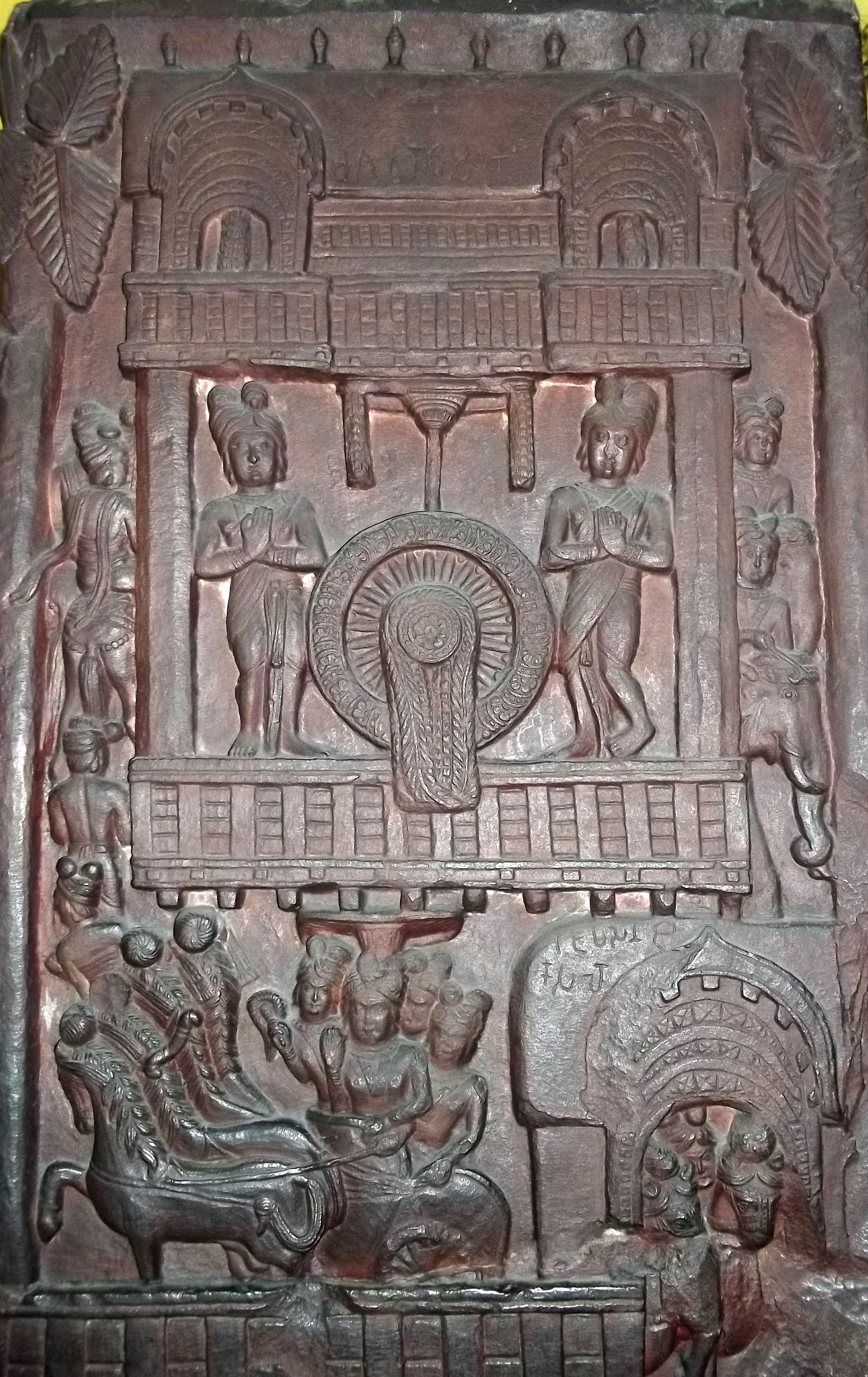
Relief from Bharhut.

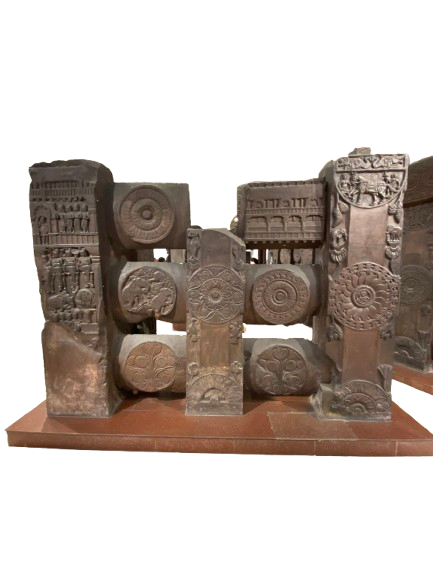
Side Guard Railing.

In conformity with the early aniconic phase of Buddhist art, the Buddha is only represented through symbols, such as the Dharma wheel, the Bodhi tree, an empty seat, footprints, or the triratana symbol.

The style represents the earliest phase of Indian art, and all characters are depicted wearing the Indian dhoti, except for one foreigner thought to be an Indo-Greek soldier, with Buddhist symbolism. The Bharhut carvings are slightly later than the Sanchi Stupa No.2 reliefs and the earlier Ajanta frescos.

An unusual feature of the Bharhut panels is the inclusion of text in the narrative panels, often identifying the individuals.

== Inscriptions ==
The Monumental Prakrit inscriptions found at Bharhut are of considerable significance in tracing the history of early Indian Buddhism and Buddhist art. 136 inscriptions mention the donors. These include individuals from Vidisha, Purika (a town somewhere in the Vindhya mountains), Pataliputra (Bihar), Karhad (Maharashtra), Bhojakata (Vidarbha, eastern Maharashtra), Kosambi (Uttar Pradesh), and Nasik (Maharashtra). 82 inscriptions serve as labels for panels depicting the Jatakas, the life of the Buddha, former Manushi Buddhas, other stories and Yakshas and Yakshinis.

== Structure and details ==
The Bharhut Stupa
Gateway
Bharhut eastern gateway.	The Bharhut eastern gateway is the only remaining of four original gateways. It was made in 100-75 BCE (most probably 75 BCE based on artistic analysis), and is therefore posterior to the railings. One of the pillar capitals, with lions, flame palmette in their back, rosettes and beads-and-reels (reconstitution). The craftsmen are thought to have been from northwestern India (probably Gandhara) as they inscribed mason's marks in Kharosthi, the script of Gandhara, throughout the gateway structure (7 such Kharoshthi mason's marks have been recorded on the gateway). Gandhara was a core territory of the Indo-Greek kingdom at the time, and these craftsmen probably brought Hellenistic techniques and styles to the manufacture of the gateway. On the contrary mason's marks in the local Brahmi script have not been found on the gateway, but exclusively on the railings (27 Brahmi mason's mark found), indicating that local craftsmen probably created the railings. The structure as a whole as well as various elements point to Hellenistic and other foreign influence, such as the fluted bell, addorsed capital of the Persepolitan order, and the abundant use of the Hellenistic flame palmette or honeysuckle motif. Besides the origin of its contributors however, the gateway retains a very strong Indian character.
Architraves (front) Architraves (back)	Reconstitution of the architraves, with position of five of the Kharosthi mason's marks. The architraves display scenes of animals who show their devotion to the Buddha (symbolized by the empty throne in the middle). The top architrave (front only) has two lions, one griffin (left), and one lion with a human head (sphinx or manticore). The bottom architraves shows four elephants and two human devotees around the symbolic Buddha. Between the architraves, are balustrade columns, some of them decorated with Indian figures. Five of the Kharosthi mason's marks (on a total of eight for the whole gateway) were discovered at the base of these columns. There were similar balustrade columns between the top and the middle architraves, but they have been lost.
Railings
	The railings are dated to 125-100 BCE, and most probably 100 BCE based on artistic analysis. The designs are very developed, and considered as posterior to those of Sanchi Stupa No.2. All the mason's marks are in the local Brahmi script, of which 28 were found, indicating that local craftsmen probably created the railings. The railings are almost entirely covered in reliefs, and display a variety of scenes, from the previous lives of the Buddha called Jatakas, to events of the life of the historical Buddha, to devotional scenes. There are also many individual medallions, thought to represent devotees or donors.
Scenes of devotion
	Diamond throne and Mahabodhi Temple around the Boddhi tree. According to the inscribed Bharhut relief related to the Diamond throne, the original Mahabodhi Temple of Asoka was an open pavilion supported on pillars. The Diamond throne shown rather exactly in the relief, was rediscovered in the 19th century. In the middle is seen the Diamond Throne or Vajrasana, decorated in front with four flat pilasters. Behind the Throne appears the trunk of the Bodhi Tree, which rises up high above the building, and on each side of the Tree there is a combined symbol of the Triratna and the Dharmachakra, standing on the top of a short pillar. On each side of the Vajrasana room there is a side room of the same style. The top of the Throne is ornamented with flowers, but there is no figure of Buddha. The relief bears the inscription: "Bhagavato Sakamuni Bodhi" ("The Bodhi (Tree) of the divine Shakyamuni"), thereby confirming the meaning of the relief.
	Tikutiko Chakamo. The inscription above this relief mentions the "Tikutiko Chakamo", or "Three-pointed wheel" (of the law). The scene depicts seven elephants and one great three-headed Serpent (or Naga) together with two lions showing their devotion to this quite particular Wheel of the Law.
Worship of the Bodhi tree. Worship of the Dharmachakra. Worship of the Bodhi tree, with Yakshini. A Royal Couple Visits the Buddha. Adoration of the Dharmachakra.
Life of the Buddha
	Maya's Dream: The virgin conception of the Buddha. This carving of the Dream of Maya relates when the Buddha's mother had a dream of a white elephant entering her body. This is the moment of the Buddha's conception. The sleeping queen is surrounded by three attendants, one of whom flicks a chauri. A water-pot is placed near the head of the bed; at its foot is an incense-burner. The theme of the virgin conception of the Buddha was repeated for many centuries, and was also an important theme in the Greco-Buddhist art of Gandhara. The story was also known in the Western world as Archelaus of Carrhae (in 278 CE) and Saint Jerome (in 340 CE) both mention the Buddha by name and narrate the tradition of his virgin birth. It has been suggested that this virgin birth legend of Buddhism influenced Christianity. Maya's dream, Sanchi, 1st century BCE. Māyā's dream, Gandhara, 2–3rd century CE. Dream of Mayadevi, Mardan. Maya's Dream, Gandhara, 2nd-3rd century CE.
	Worshipping Siddhartha's Hair The same scene at Sanchi. In the lower part of the panel is a company of deities in the Trayastrimsa heaven, where Indra held sway, rejoicing over and worshiping the hair of the Bodhisattva. The story told in the Buddhist scriptures is that, before embracing a religious life, Gautama divested himself of his princely garments and cut off his long hair with his sword, casting both hair and turban into the air, whence they were borne by the devas to the Trayastrimsa heaven and worshiped there.
	Descent of the Buddha from the Trayastrimsa Heaven, Sanchi. Descent of the Buddha from the Trayastrimsa Heaven at Sankissa. The descent of the Buddha from the Trayastrimsa Heaven, where Maya, his mother, had been reborn and whither he himself ascended to preach the Law to her. This miracle is supposed to have taken place at Sankissa (Sankasya). In the center of the relief is the miraculous ladder by which the Buddha descended, attended by Brahma and Indra. At the foot of the ladder the tree and throne, symbols of the presence of the Buddha, with devotees on either side, indicating that the Buddha has returned again to earth.
	The Jetavahana Monastery today. An even earlier depiction of the Jetavana Garden story at Sravasti, Bodh Gaya Mahabodhi Temple. The Jetavana Monastery. The following inscription, which is placed immediately below the sculpture, gives the name of the monastery, as well as that of the builder Anatha-pindika: "Jetavana Anadhapediko deti Kotisanthatena Keta" ("Anathapindika presents Jetavana, (having become) its purchaser for a layer of kotis."), kotis being gold coins. A householder named Anathapindika had purchased the garden of Jeta for a layer of kotis, for 18 kotis of gold, and began to build. In the midst he built Buddha's pavilion. Several monastic buildings were erected by Anathapindika at Jetavana, until Gautama Buddha came from Rajagriha to Sravasti, where he was met by the wealthy man Setthi. The Blessed One, followed by a great company of monks, entered the Monastery of Jetavana. Then Anathapindika asked him, "Lord, how am I to proceed in the matter of this monastery? Since you ask me, householder, bestow this monastery upon the Buddhist clergy, present and to come.' And the great man replied, "It is well. This monastery of Jetavana I give to the clergy, present and to come, in all parts of the world, with the Buddha at their head." The sculptor has apparently aimed at giving a view of the great Buddhist Vihara of Jetavana, whilst illustrating the story of its establishment by Anathapindika. In the foreground there is a bullock cart, with the bullocks unyoked sitting beside it, and with the yoke tilted up in the air to show that the cart has been unloaded. In front are two men, each holding a very small object between his thumb and forefinger. These are Anathapindika himself, and his treasurer, counting out the gold pieces brought in the cart. Above them are two other figures seated, and busily engaged in covering the surface of the garden with the gold coins, which are here represented as square pieces touching one another, as the price of its purchase. To the left are six other figures, probably Prince Jeta and his friends; and in the very middle of the composition there is Anathapindika himself carrying a vessel, just like a tea kettle, in both hands, for the purpose of pouring water over Buddha's hands as a pledge of the completion of his gift. Anathapindika, who became known for his foremost generosity and character upon death entered the Tushita heaven, and became a Bodhisattva.
Previous lives of the Buddha (Jatakas)
	The Mahakapi Jataka is the centerpiece of this railing section. Mahakapi Jataka In this jataka tale, the Buddha, in a previous incarnation as a monkey king, performs an act of self-sacrifice by offering his own body as a bridge, by which his fellow monkeys can escape from a human king who is attacking them. A short section of the river, across which the monkeys are escaping, is indicated by fish designs. Directly below that, the impressed humans are holding out a blanket to catch him when he falls from his position. At the very bottom (continuous narrative), the now recovered Buddha-to-be preaches to the king. (Mahakapi Jataka. Bharhut, c. 100 BCE. Indian Museum, Calcutta.); The Mahakapi Jataka is also visible at Sanchi in this relief.
	Nigrodha Miga Jātaka. The Nigrodha Miga Jātaka (Banyan Deer Birth-story, #12 in the E.B. Cowell Jātaka stories, Volume 1) is the story of how in a past birth, born as a golden deer, Bodhisattā rescues a pregnant doe from death by slaughter. The medallion represents 3 scenes: (1) The four deer running away and one of them looking back at the far left and the man with bow at the far right represent the first scene: that of the hunt. (2) The doe lying down at the bottom left looking at the antlered deer represents the second scene: that of the pregnant doe being subjected to the slaughter today but Banyan deer tells her to go and takes her place. Cook/Butcher behind the Banyan deer watches this [and then he goes to tell the King, who comes with his entourage]. (3) The antlered deer sitting in the middle and preaching to the king [who is listening respectfully with folded hands] and his entourage is the third scene: that one should associate with good people.
	Kurunga Miga Jataka. This story is about three friends who lived in a forest: an antelope, a woodpecker and a tortoise. One day, the antelope was caught in the noose of a hunter, and the tortoise endeavoured to bite through the noose to free the antelope, while the woodpecker, was making cries of ill-omen, so that the hunter would remain in his hut. The antelope escaped, but the tortoise, exhausted by her efforts, was caught by the hunter. The antelope then enticed the hunter to follow her in the forest, so that the tortoise was able to flee. The antelope was the Bodhisatta, that is the Buddha in a former life, Sāriputta, a disciple of the Buddha, was the woodpecker, Moggallana, also a disciple, was the tortoise in his former life. Devadatta however, a traditional enemy of the Buddha, was the hunter. This story is meant to demonstrate the wickedness of Devadatta, as well as the friendship and collaboration between the Buddha and his disciples, even in previous lives.
	Muga Pakaya Jataka/ Mugapakkha Jataka/ Temiya Jataka. This is the story of "The dumb Prince". Chanda Devi, the wife of the king of Varanasi, had no son. Sakka, the king of the devas, decided to help her. He persuaded the Bodhisattva (the future Buddha), who was then in the realm of the Tavatimsa, to descend into her womb so that she could bear a child. The Bodhisattva thus entered the womb of the Queen, and when he was born was called Temiya. Temiya then realized that his father was a king, but having himself been king of Varanasi in a previous life, a rule which ended with 20.000 years in hell, he did not want to inherit the throne. He thus decided to play dumb and inactive to avoid the inheritance. Being worthless, his father arranged for his death, and ordered the charioteer Sunanda to perform the crime. When Sunanda was digging the grave in preparation, Temiya explained to him his stratagem. Impressed, Sunanda then wanted to be an ascetic and follow Temiya. Temiya then gave a sermon to the King and the Queen. They were impressed and also expressed the wish to become ascetics. Soon, all the citizens of the kingdom, as well as two neighboring kingdoms, become followers of Temiya. The relief shows Temiya as a baby in the king's lap (top left). Temiya is then seen standing behind charioteer Sunanda in the cemetery, who is digging the grave (bottom right). Temiya, as an ascetic, then gives a discourse to the people (top right).
Asadrisa Jataka. Bull and Tiger Jataka. Dasaratha Jataka. Chhandantiya Jataka. Isi-Singe Jataka. Latuwa Jataka. Naga Jataka. Yavamajhakiya Jataka. Yambumane-Avayesi Jataka or Andha-Bhuta Jataka. Kinara Jataka. Hansa Jataka. Monkey Jataka. Monkey Jataka.
Individuals
	Other Greek-looking foreigners, in Greek dress and playing carnyxes and aolus flute, are known from the Stupa at Sanchi. The Bharhut Yavana. The Greeks (specifically the Indo-Greeks) were evidently known at this date to people in the middle of India and called "Yavanas"; here, a Greek warrior has been coopted into the role of dvarapala (Guardian of a temple gate). The evidence includes his hairstyle (short curly hair with Greek royal headband), tunic, and boots. In his right hand he holds a grape plant, emblematic of his origin. The sheath of his broadsword is decorated with a nandipada, symbol of Buddhism. There is an inscription above the relief, classified as Inscription 55 in the Pillars of Railing of the SW Quadrant at Bharhut, is in the Brahmi script and reads from left to right: "Bhadanta Mahilasa thabho dânam" "Pillar-gift of the lay brother Mahila."
	Lakshmi on a coin of Indo-Scythian king Azilises. Buddha's mother Mahamaya.also known as Māhāmāyā and Māyādevī, was the queen of Shakya and the birth mother of Gautama Buddha, the sage on whose teachings Buddhism was founded. She was the wife of Śuddhodana, the king of the Shakya kingdom. She was sister of Mahāpajāpatī Gotamī, the first Buddhist nun ordained by the Buddha. But she also used to be an important deity in Buddhism, where she was also a goddess of abundance and fortune, and was represented on the oldest surviving stupas and cave temples. In this typical iconography, called Māhāmāyā and Māyādevī, she is shown standing on a lotus and being lustrated by two elephants pouring water on her. Lakshmi already appeared on Indo-Greek coinage as early as 180 BCE (as a female dancer holding a lotus flower), and later on Indo-Scythian coins in the 1st century BCE.
Devotee Female bust Female Figure holding a Lotus Female Figure holding a Torch Male and Female Figures Male Figure Male Figure on top of Column Male Figure Male Figure holding a Lotus Male Figure holding a Flower Male Figure

Bharhut at the time of discovery.
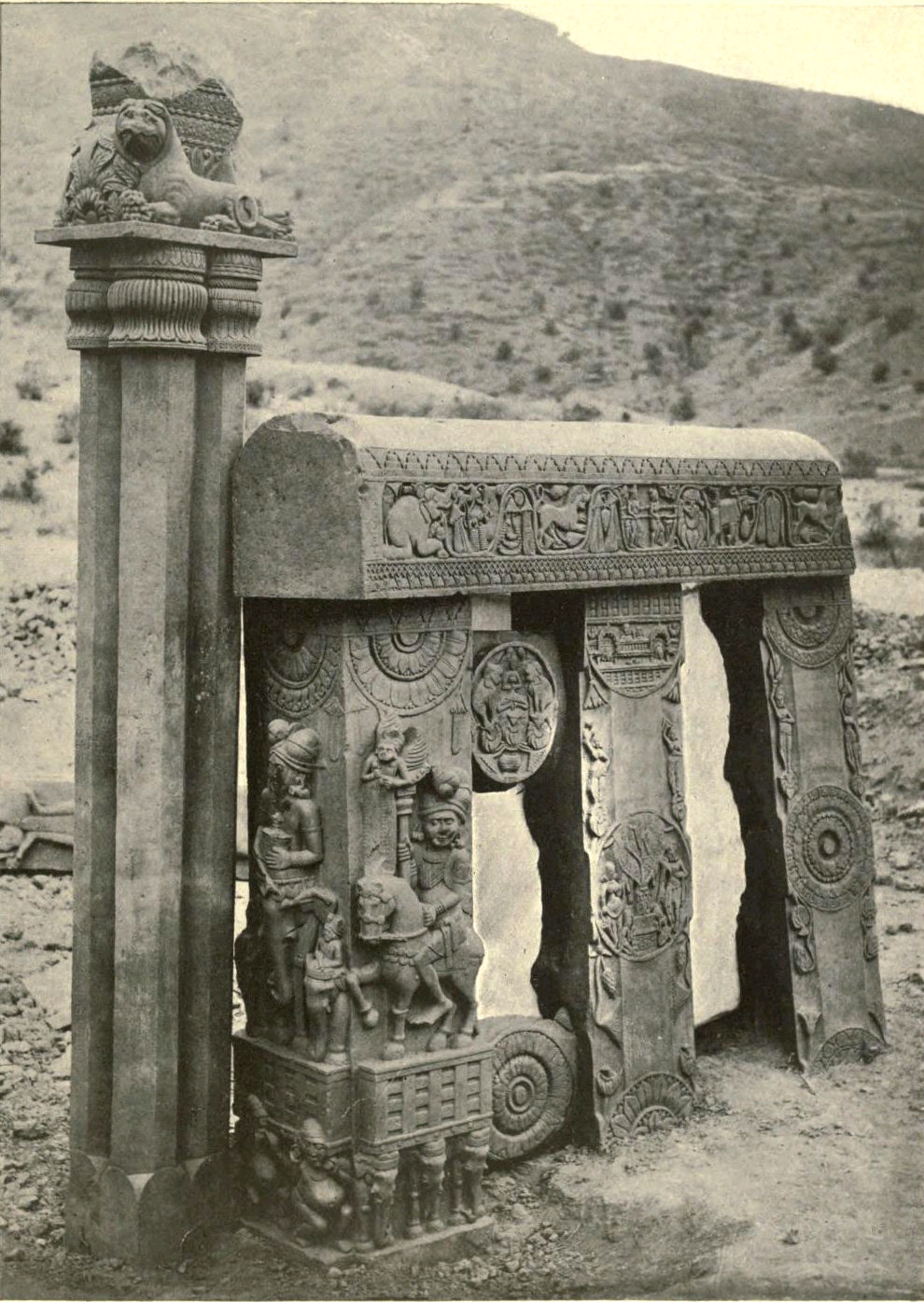
East Gateway

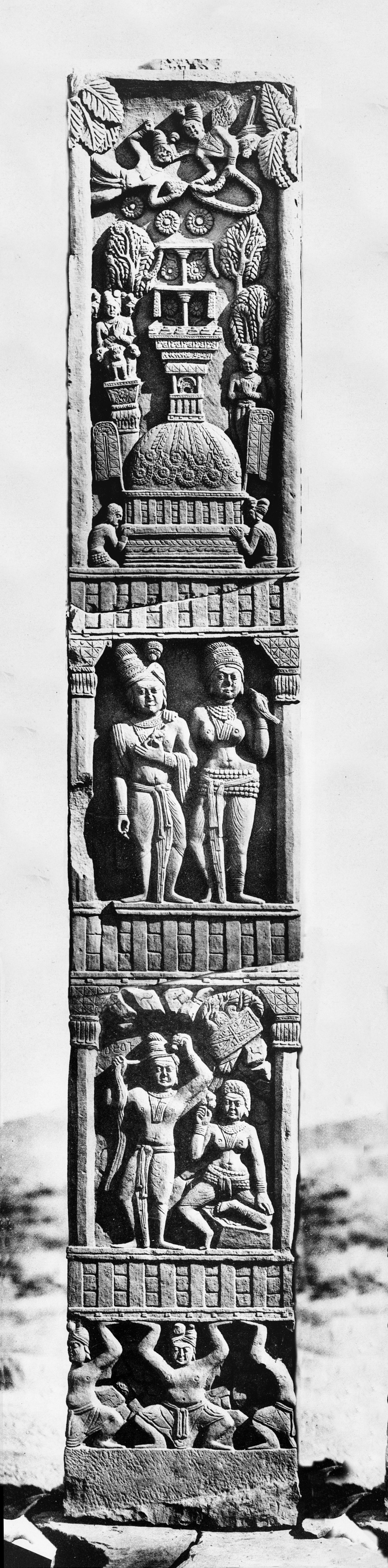
Railing post.

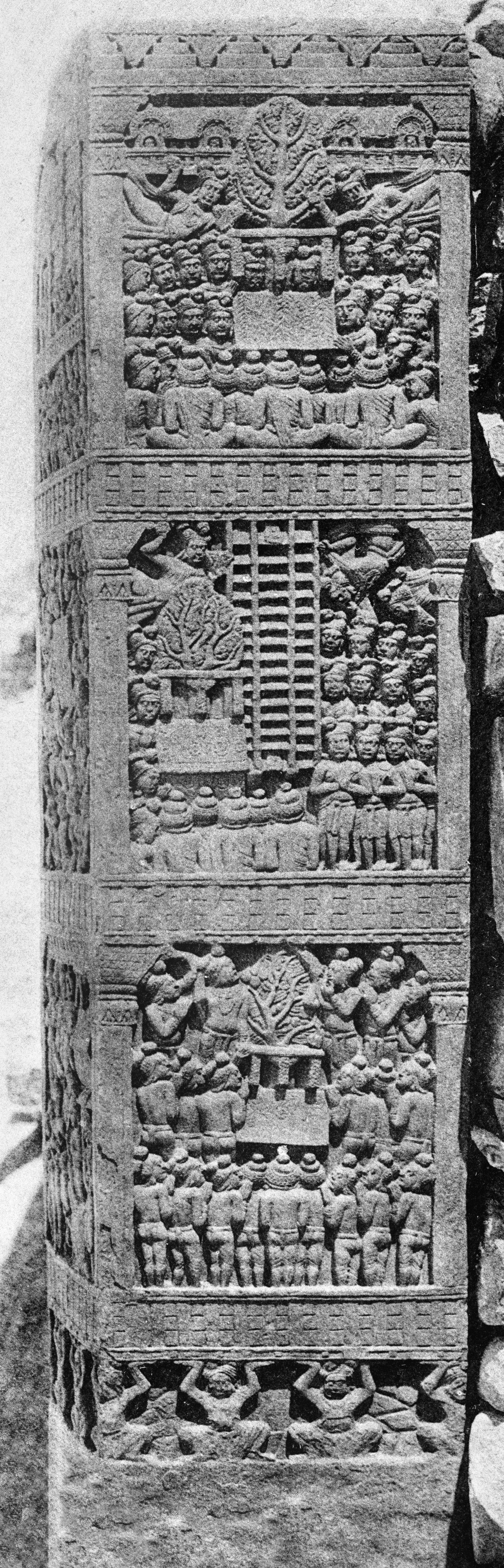
Post with reliefs.

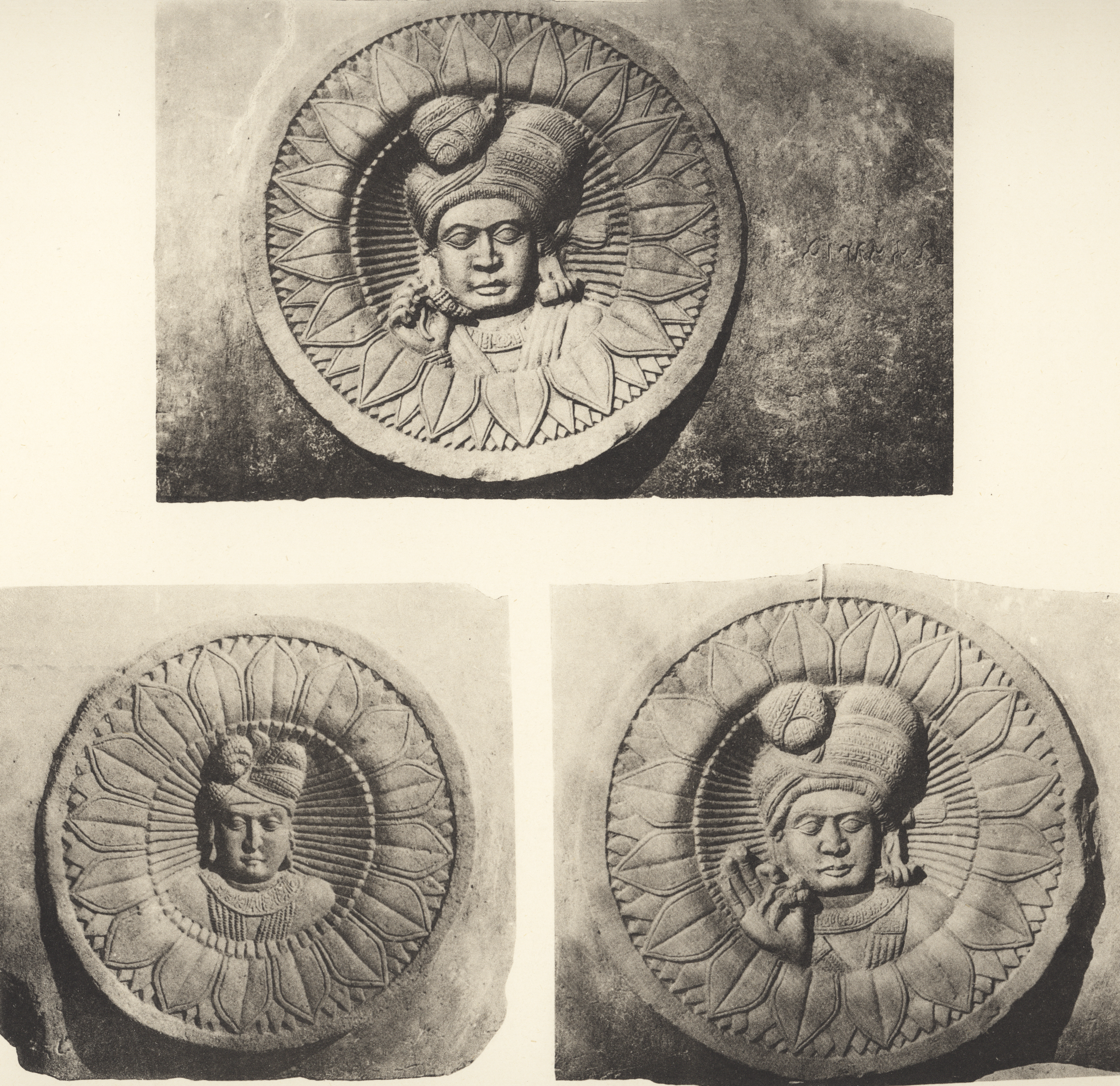
Donators.

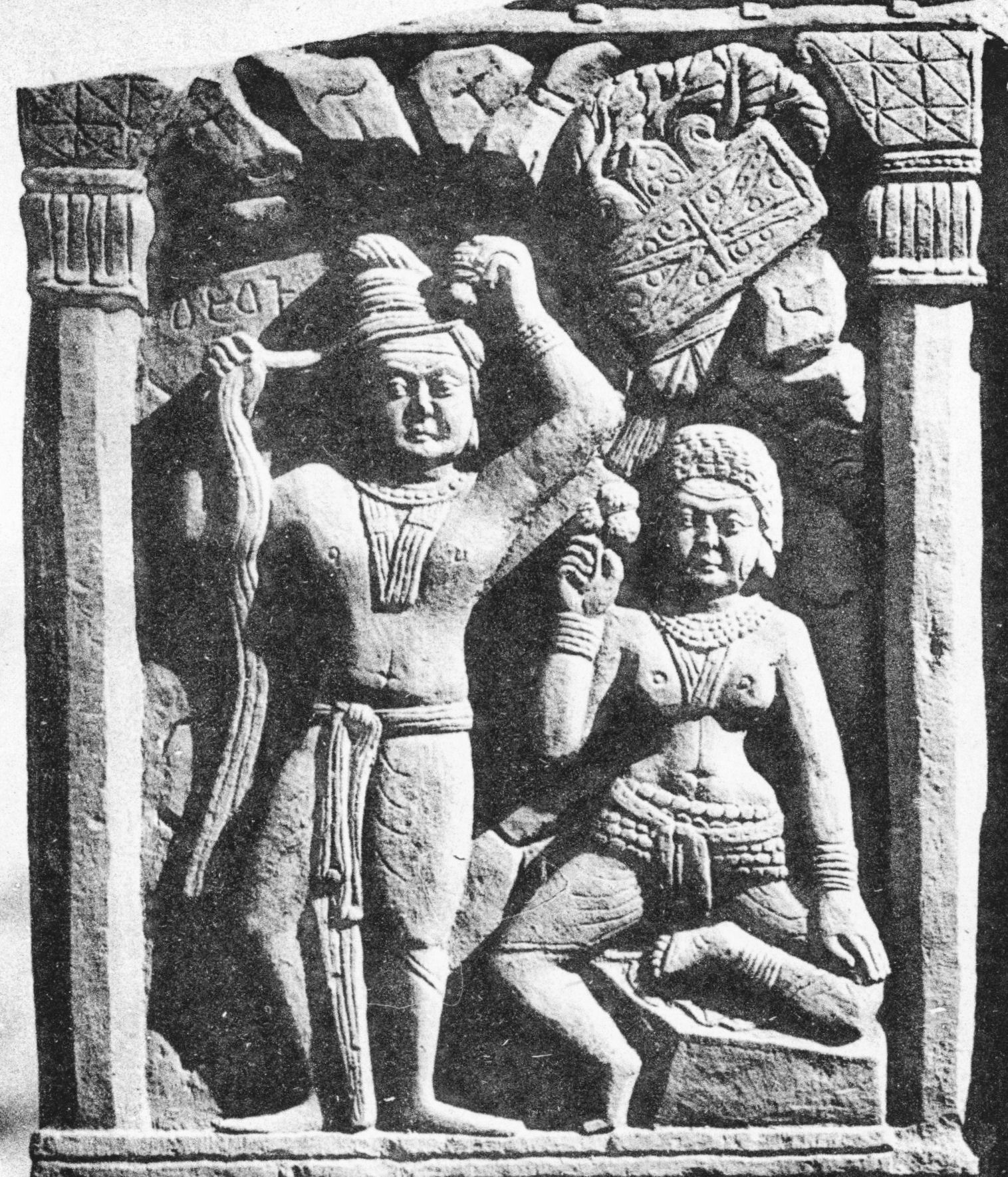
Devotees.

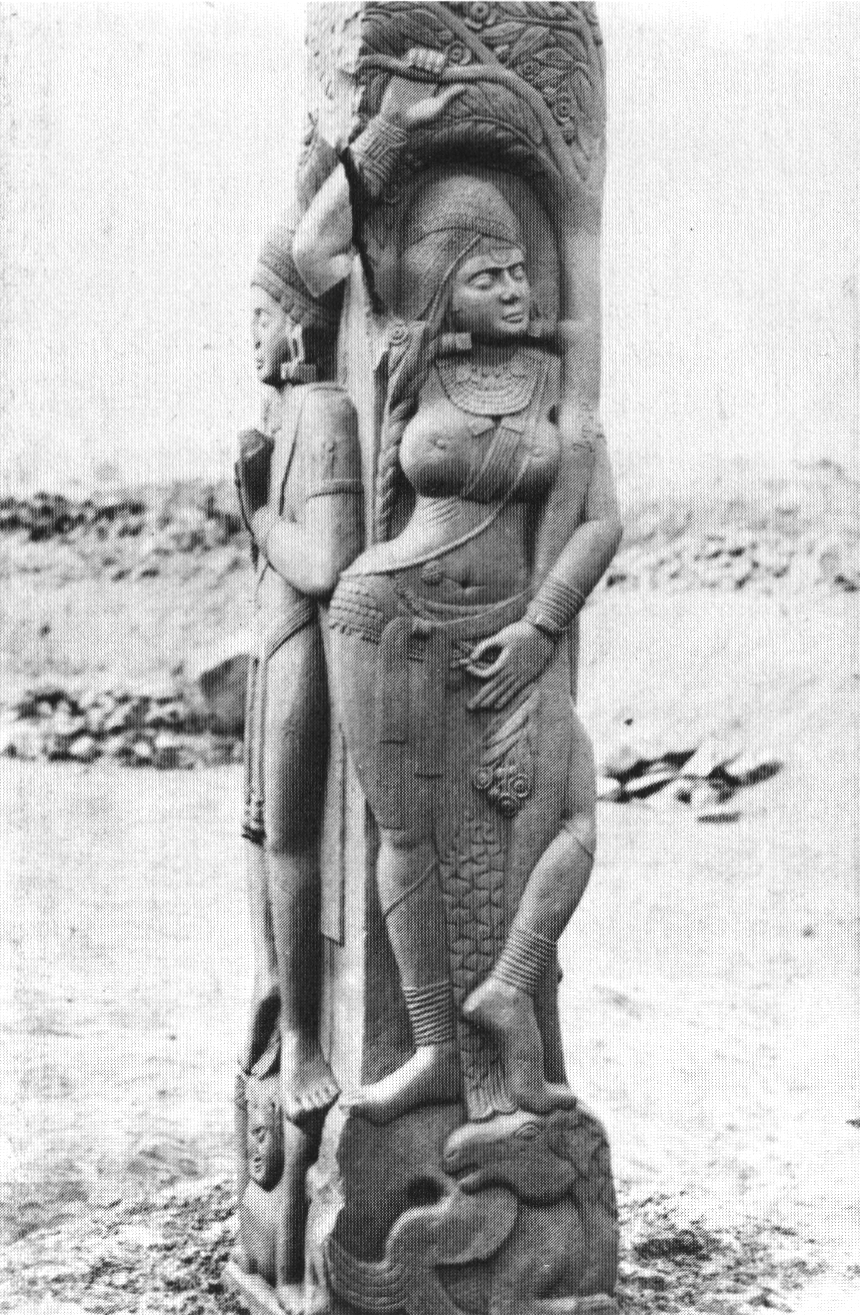
Yakshini.

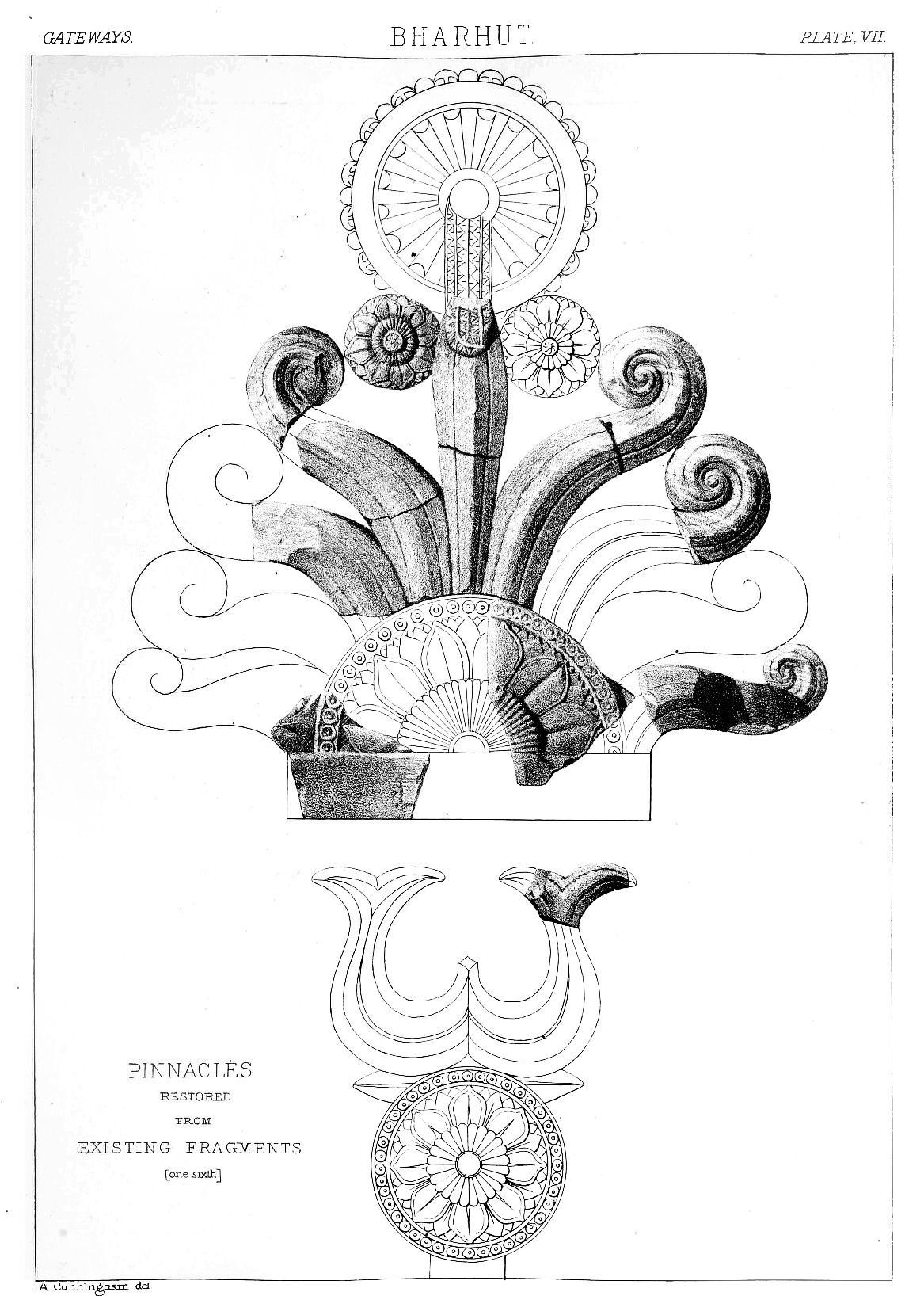
Restoration plans.

== Survival in 11-12th century ==
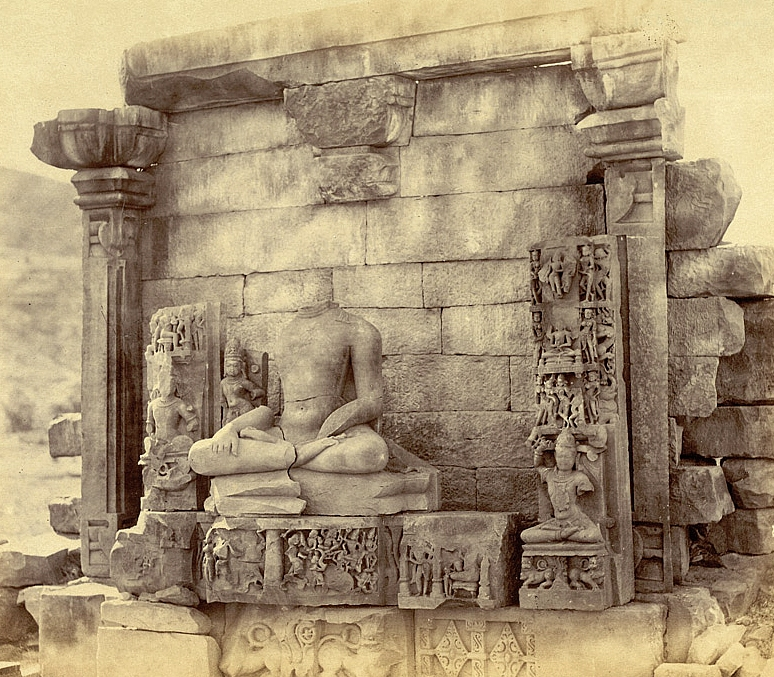
Buddha sculpture at Bharhut 11-12th cent

A Buddha sculpture datable to 11-12th century was also found, in addition to a Sanskrit inscription, belonging to a vihara structure. This demonstrates that Buddhism at the site survived well until 11-12th century, although nothing datable to the intervening period has been found.

In addition to the magnificent stone railing of the old Stupa, there are the remains of a medieval Buddhist Vihara, with a colossal statue, and several smaller Buddhist figures which cannot be dated much earlier than 1000 A.D. It seems probable, therefore, that the exercise of the Buddhist religion may have been carried on for nearly 15 centuries with little or perhaps no interruption. Everywhere the advent of the Muhammadans gave the final blow to Buddhism, and their bigotry and intolerance swept away the few lingering remains which the Brahmans had spared.

— Alexander Cunningham, The Stûpa of Bharhut.

Although the best known remains are from the 1st centuries BCE/CE, Bharhut, just as Sanchi, continued to be used as a Buddhist monastic center for more than a millennium. But the monuments of Bharhut were ultimately destroyed and most of the remains were used by local villagers as building material.

== Recently found Buddhist remains in region near Bharhut and Sanchi ==
Several minor Stupas and Buddhist statues have been discovered in the region near Sanchi and Bharhut dating up to 12th century CE. They demonstrate that Buddhism was widespread in this region and not just confined to Sanchi and Bharhut, and survived until 12th century, like the Sanchi complex itself, although greatly declining after 9-10th century. These include:

- Banshipur village, Damoh
- Madighat in Rewa district
- Buddha Danda, Singrauli
- Bilahri, Katni
- Kuwarpur, Sagar Dist/Bansa Damoh Dist
- Damoh Museum Buddha
- Deur Kothar, Rewa
- Devgarh, Lalitpur
- Khajuraho (Museum)
- Mahoba, 11-12th cent. sculptures

== Gallery ==
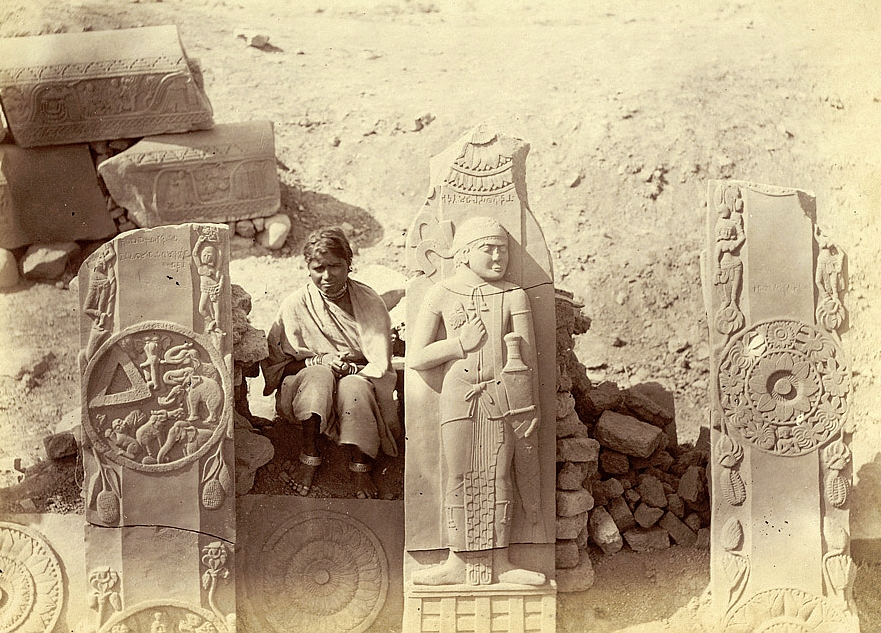
Bharhut excavation, with the Bharhut Yavana

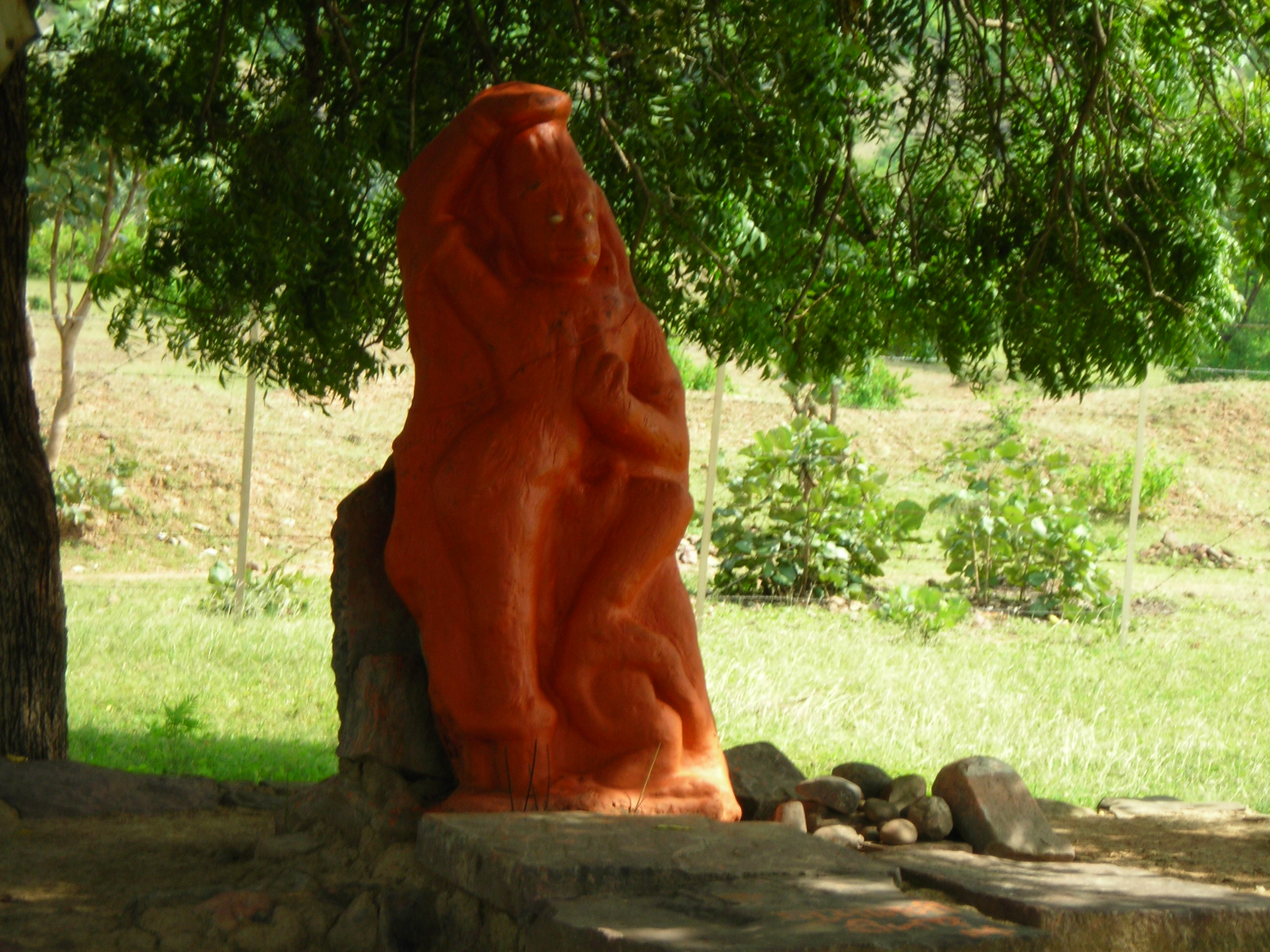
The Yaksha relief at Bharhut being worshipped as Hanuman by local villagers

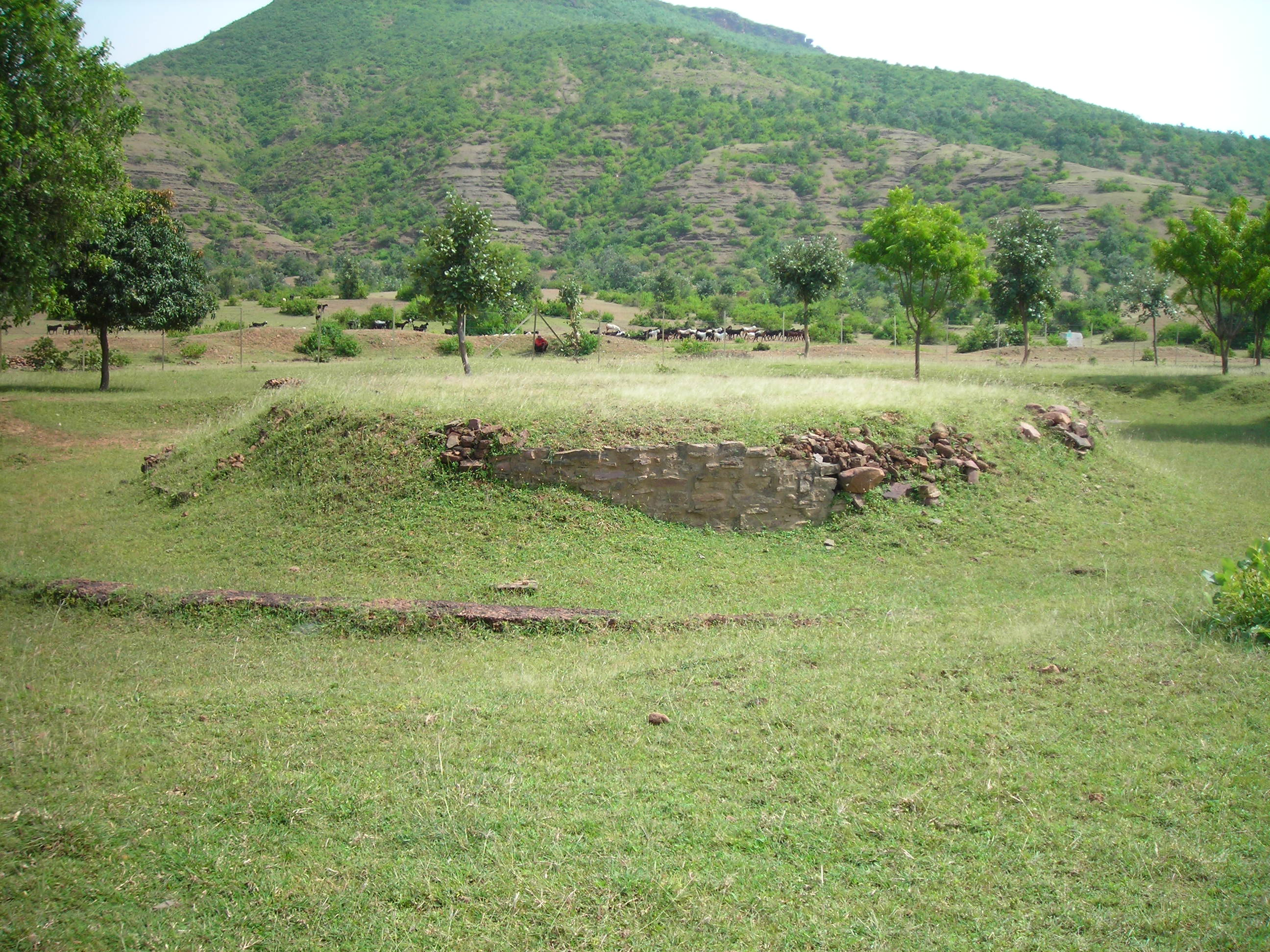
The ruined Bharhut Stupa; seen behind it is the Lal Pahadi (Red Mountain)

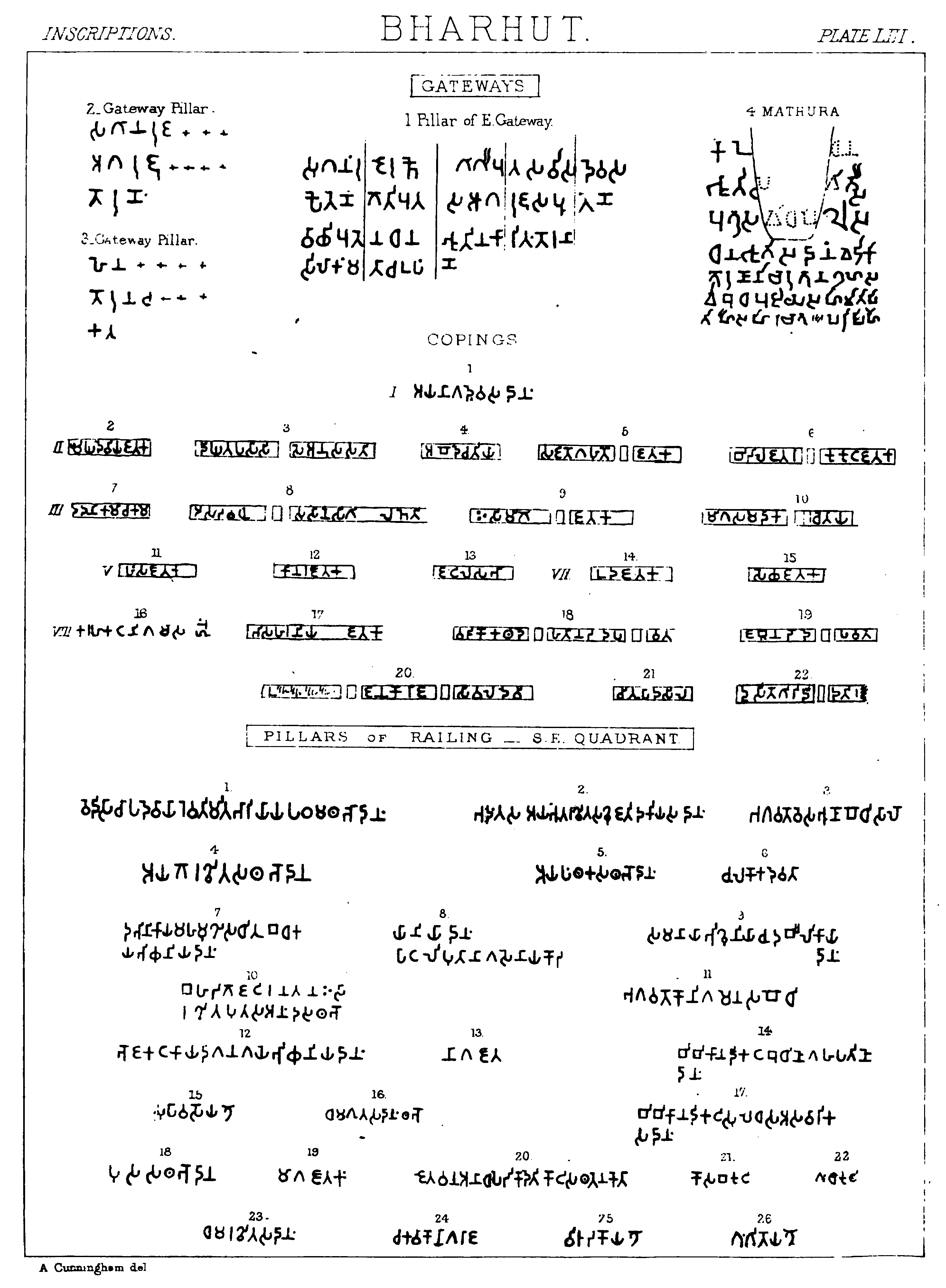
Inscriptions

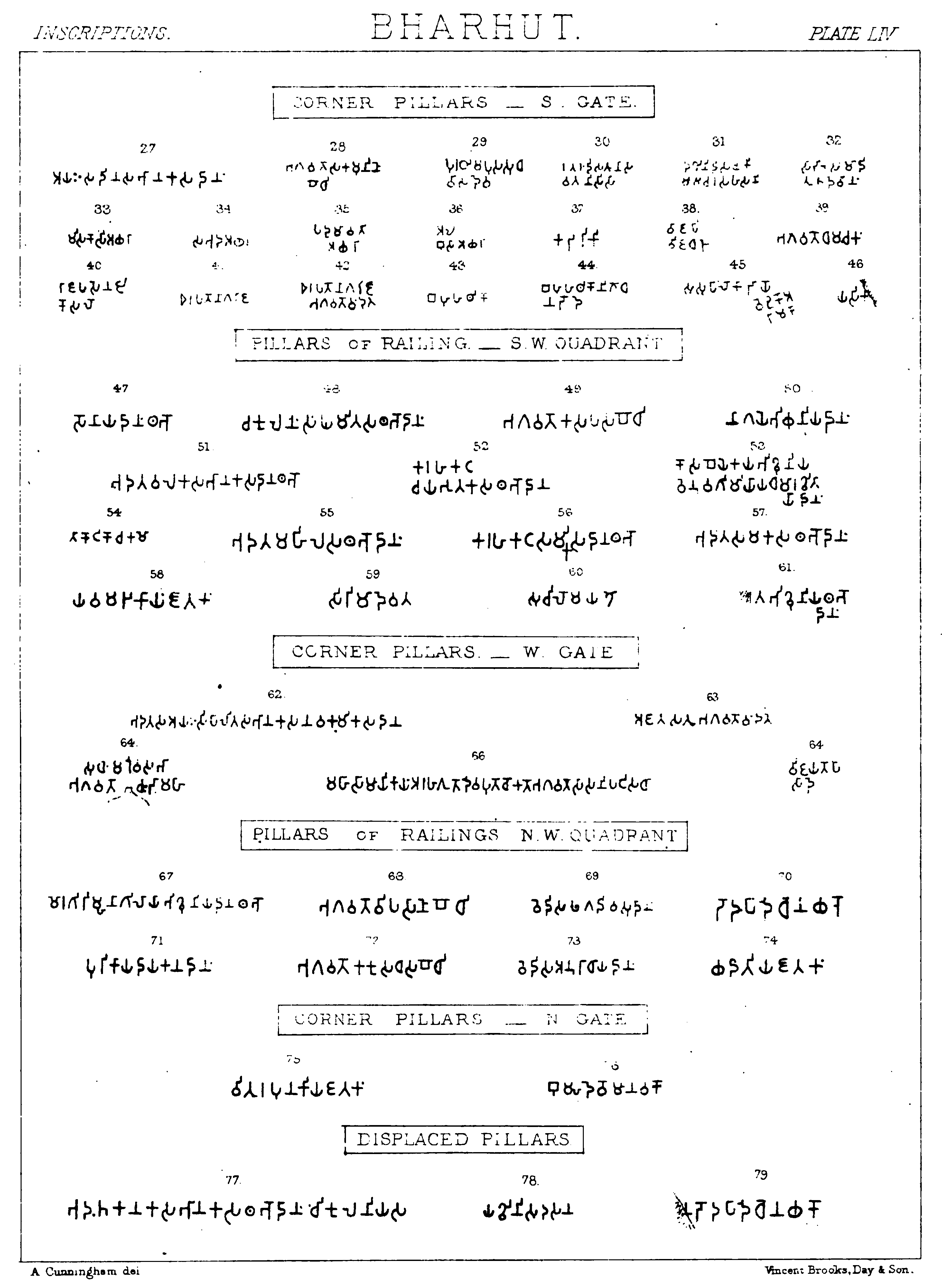
Inscriptions

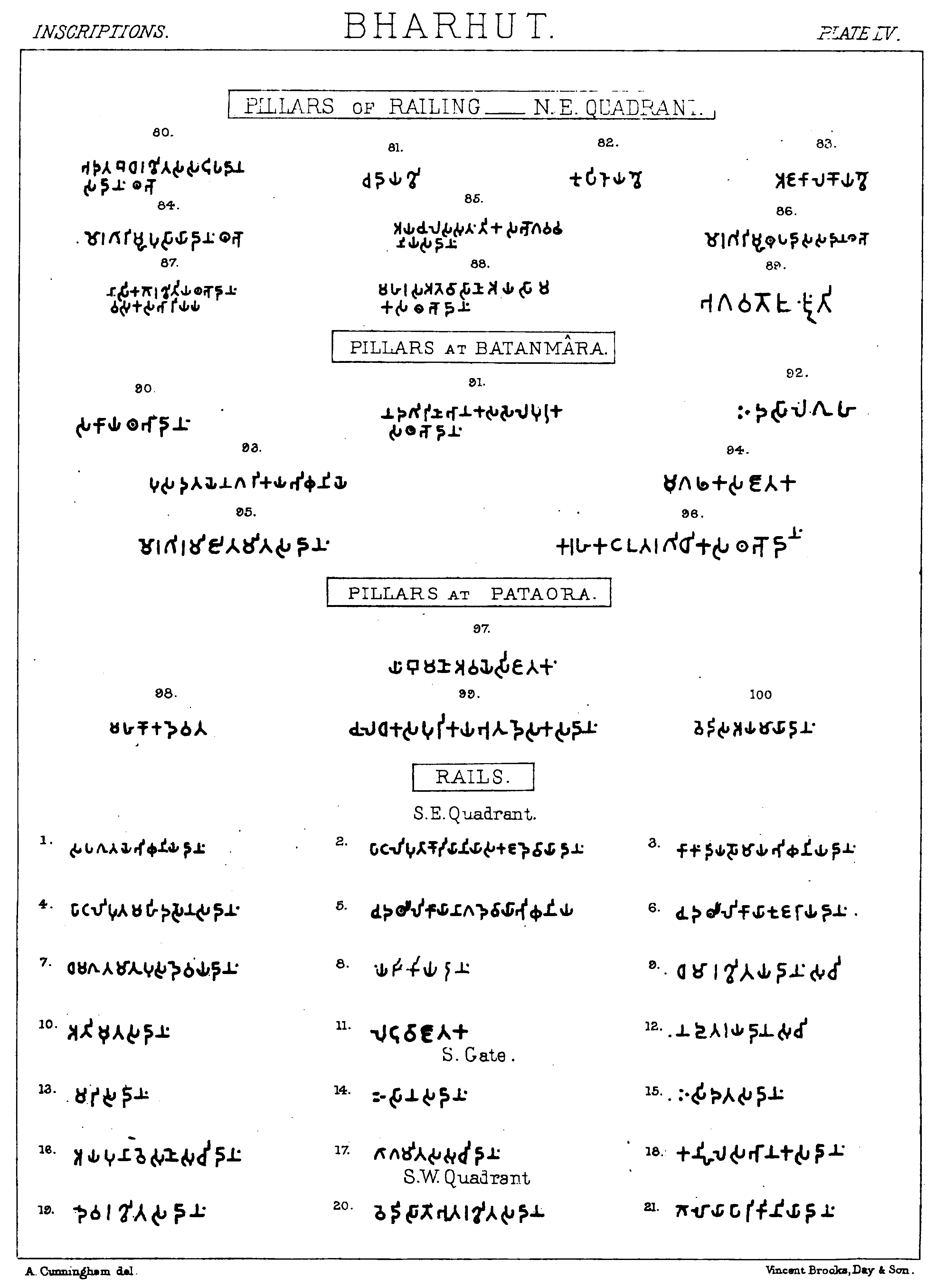
Inscriptions

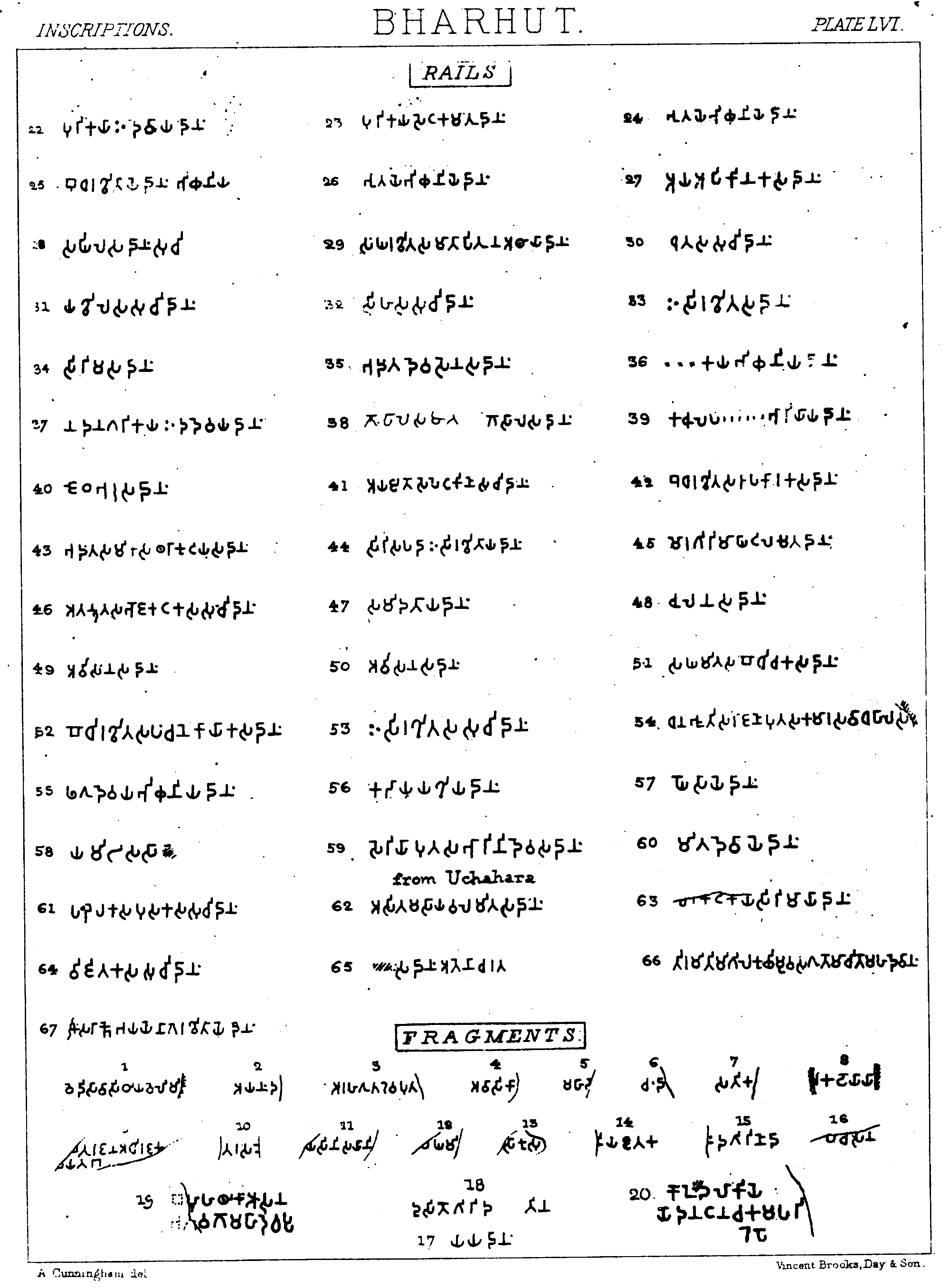
Inscriptions

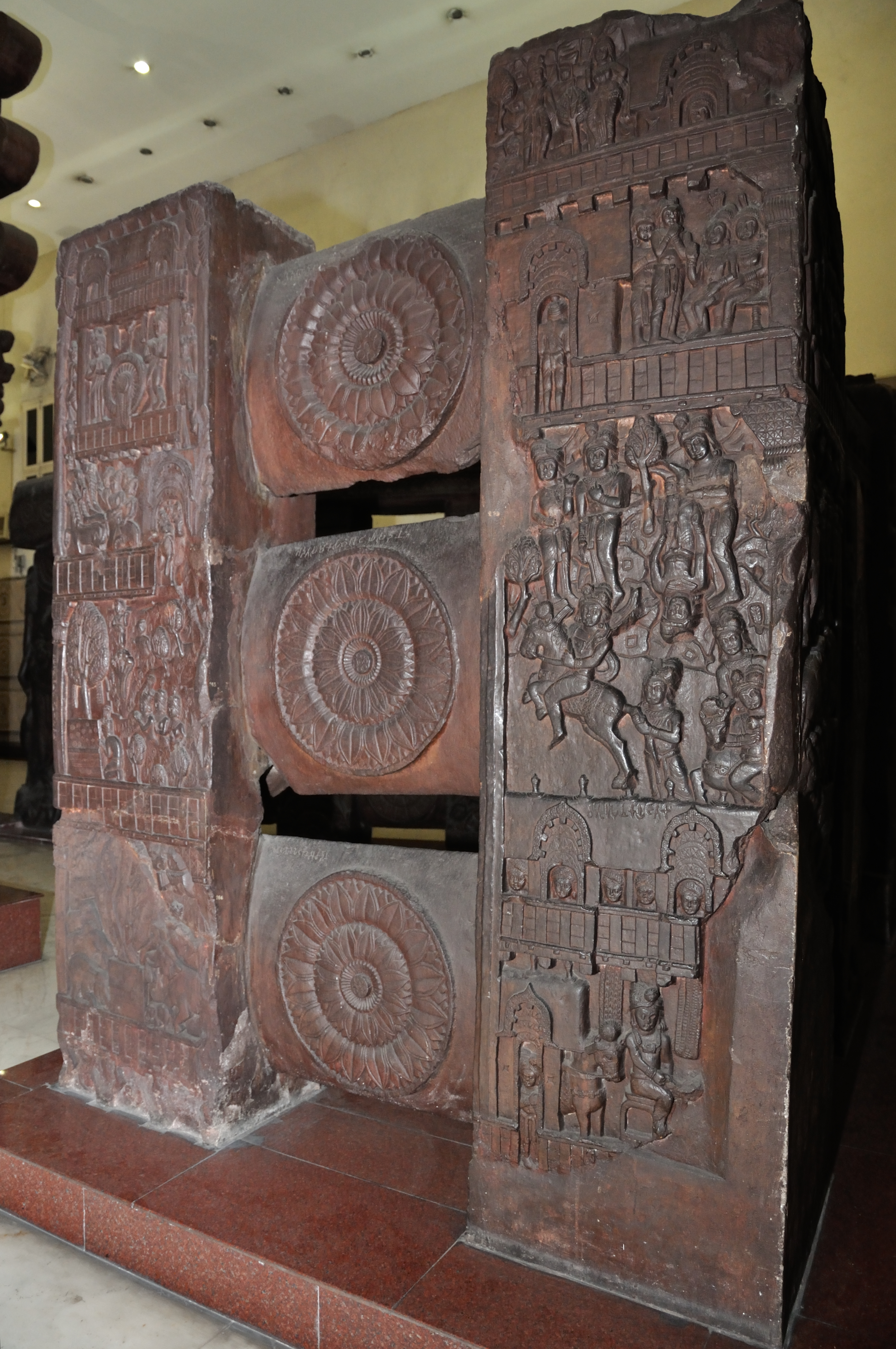
Railing section at Indian Museum.

== See also ==
- Sanchi
- Deorkothar
