= Deur Kothar =

Archaeological site in India

Deur Kothar (Deorkothar)
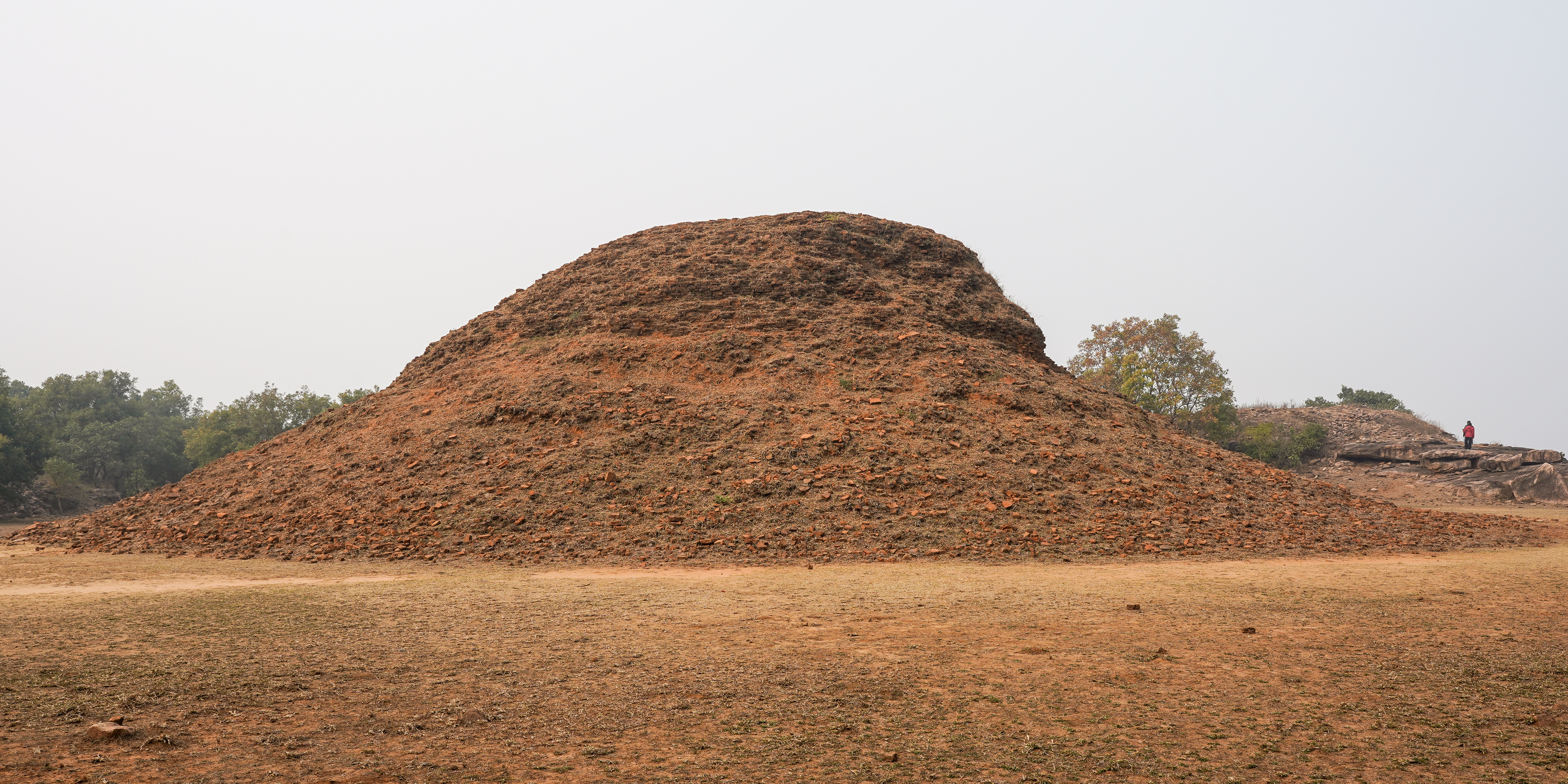
- Stupa at Deur Kothar

- Location within India

Religion
- Affiliation: Buddhism
- District: Rewa
- Status: Preserved

Location
- Location: India
- State: Madhya Pradesh
- Coordinates: 24.932388°N 81.663045°E

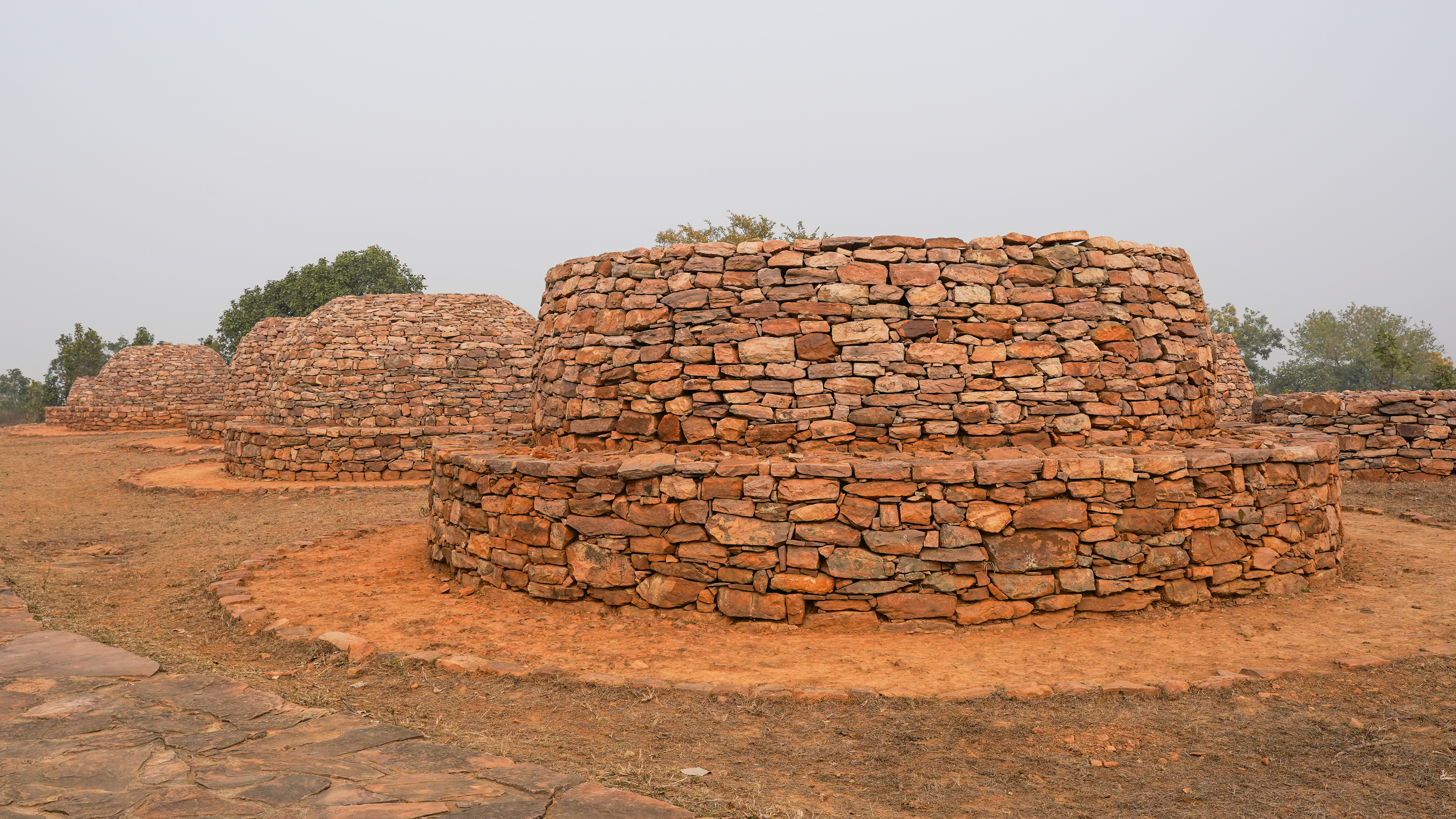
Reconstructed stupas at Deorkothar

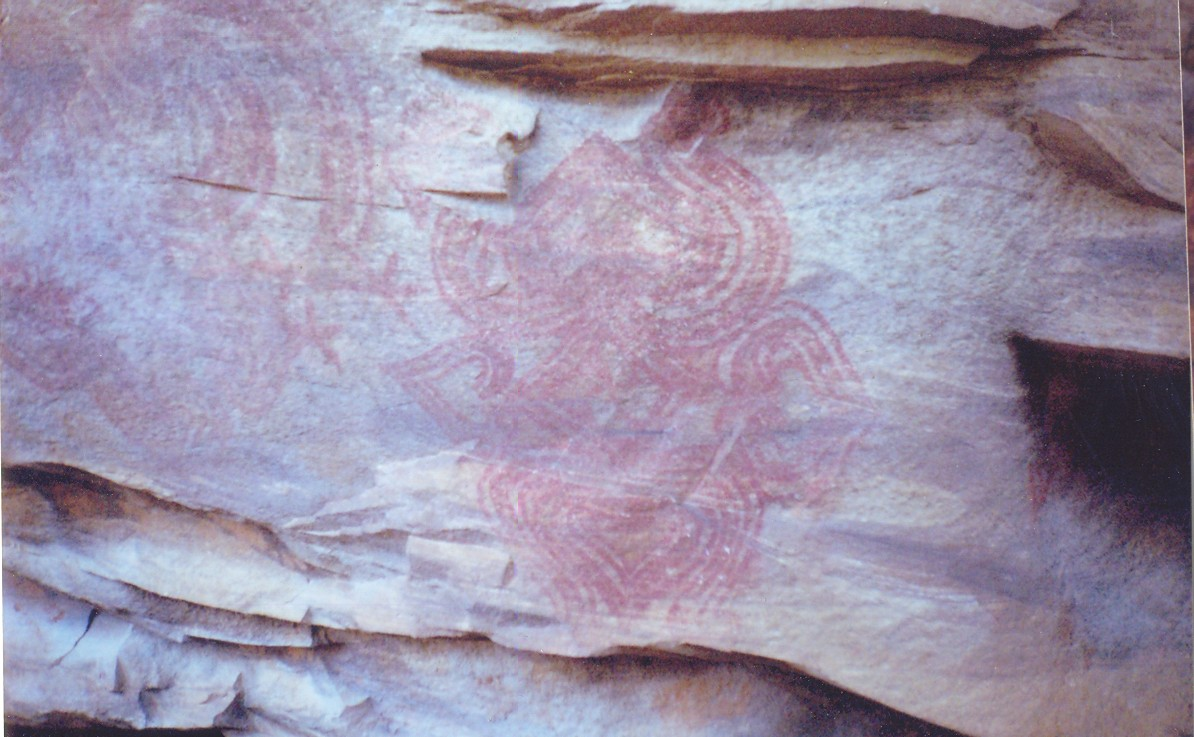
Rock paintings in caves at Deorkothar

Deorkothar Brahmi inscription

Deorkothar (Note: Hindi: देवर कोठार, Hindi pronunciation: [d̪eːʋərkoːʈʰaːr]) or Deur Kothar (Note: Hindi: देउर कोठार, Hindi pronunciation: [d̪eːʊr koːʈʰaːr]) is a location of archaeological importance in the Rewa district of Madhya Pradesh, Central India. Apart from some prehistoric rock art, it is mainly known for remains of some of the earliest Buddhist stupas, and brief inscriptions giving master-disciple successions of only 12 generations from the Buddha.

== The discovery and excavations ==
P.K. Mishra (Archaeological Survey of India) discovered Deorkothar in 1982 along with Ajit Singh, sarpanch of village Barhat. It was declared a monument of national importance in 1988 by the Government of India and is being preserved and conserved by Archaeological Survey of India, Bhopal.

Realising the importance of the site, and its likely international bearing on the early history of Buddhism, the Archaeological Survey of India decided to carry out extensive excavations at the site. The excavations were started at the site in 1999 and continued up to 2000. The site is marked by four stupa mounds built out of brick out of which two stupas No. 1 and 2 were subjected to archaeological excavations. Stupa no. 1 is about 9 m (30 ft) high. There are remnants of 30 stupas made of stones or bricks.

== Deorkothar rock paintings ==
In the surrounding area, there are 63 rock shelters with old rock paintings. These were examined, and several of them published, by archeologist Sanskriti Singh of Baroda University, who concludes the rock art is "datable to the prehistoric and historic periods". The dominant motifs include human figures, handprints, animal figures, geometric patterns, decorative patterns (alpanas), horse riders, stupa paintings, inscriptions (painted and incised). Other motifs in the shelters include chariots, birds, humans riding elephants etc. On the ceilings, geometric patterns reoccur in the style of prerefigurative art suggestive of the Upper Palaeolithic or Mesolithic period. Closeby, an array of microlithic tools was found (blade tools, micro-blades, points, etc), which can be associated with the Mesolithic period.

== Deorkothar inscriptions ==
The Buddhist site has Prakrit language inscriptions in early Brahmi script. The inscriptions are estimated to be made either around 200 BCE ("but the date is estimated on paleography|paleographical evidence alone, and is therefore precarious"), or later in the 2nd century BCE. The main inscription (No.1) was found on a broken pillar shaft. Other inscriptions in the same early Brahmi, that simply list names of donors of individual rock shelters, occur in the rock shelters around (example given by Singh).

The gist of the inscription, pertains to the erection and dedication of stone pillar by a monk named Upasaka (Note: The name has all "a" vowels short, not to be confused with upasaka (in which the second "a" is long)) and his disciples in memory of the Buddha, the enlightened one. The inscription speaks about an acharya, named Dhammadeva, and his three disciples – Uttaramitra, Bhadra and Upasaka, who used to reside in the monastery. They installed this pillar, dedicating it to the Buddha.

The first published transliteration of inscription 1 was given in Devanagari script by Mishra as follows:

भ ग व तो बु ध
उ त र मि त्रो उ त र मि त्र स अ
भ ड्‍ भ ड्‍ स आ ते वा सि ना दि नु
उ पा स क स आ ते वा सि स व ज य स व
ध म द वे न के क डी के न ब स ति ये
उ स पि तो भं भो आ आ च रि ये न क सि

In 2011, Buddhist Studies scholar Peter Skilling visited Deorkothar, and took photos of the inscriptions. He and Oskar Von Hinüber worked on a translation and study, and then some further work was done by Richard Salomon and Joseph Marino. The transliteration of the two main inscriptions, as reconstructed by Salomon and Marino (2014), is given below (simplified here by removing the emendation marks), together with their translation:

=== Inscription 1 ===
bhagavato būdhasa sakamunisa ātevāsi… utaramitro utaramitrasa ātevāsi… bhaḍu bhaḍusa ātevāsi nāṃdi nāṃdisa ātevāsi … upasakasa ātevāsi savajayo savajayasa ātevāsi … dhamadevena kokuḍikena bahūsūtiyena … usapito thabho ācariyena kasi …

Translation :

The student of Lord Buddha Śākyamuni [was] … Utaramitra. The student of Utaramitra [was] … Bhaḍu. The student of Bhaḍu [was] Nāṃdi. The student of Nāṃdi [was] … The student of Upasaka [was] Savajayo. The student of Savajaya … By Dhamadeva, the Kokuḍika-Bahusutiya … the pillar was erected. By the master Kasi…

=== Inscription 2 (fragments 1 and 26) ===
… ātevāsi anūrudho anūrudhasa ātevāsi savanāṃdo savanāṃdasa ātevāsi … ātevāsi disagiri disagirisa ātevāsi bharaṇo bharaṇasa ātevāsi …ātevāsi ñātakadhamaguto ñātakadhamagutasa ātevāsi … sa ātevāsi dhamadino dhamadinasa ātevāsi …ch.dakena thabho kārāpito giṃjakiy…torano kato thabo usapito ca

Translation:

The student of …[was] Anuruddha. The student of Anuruddha [was] Savanāṃda. The student of Savanāṃda [was] … The student of … [was] Disagiri. The student of Disagiri [was] Bharaṇa. The student of Bharaṇa [was] … The student of … [was] Ñātakadhamaguta. The student of Ñātakadhamaguta [was] … The student of … was Dhamadina. The student of Dhamadina [was] … The pillar was caused to be made by …chadaka at (?) the brick … the gateway was made and the pillar was erected …

=== Interpretation and significance ===
The inscriptions, as reconstructed above, record two lineages of disciples, one lineage from the Buddha through generations of disciples to one called Dhammadeva, the donor of the pillar, and the other from the Buddha through Anuruddha (a well-known disciple of the Buddha) to a now lost name of another donor of the pillar. Based on an assessment of the number of letters broken off the inscription 1 (and a guess as to how many names are thus missing), Skilling and von Hinüber have tentatively concluded, that "altogether at least nine or at most twelve persons were mentioned in this record, connected to each other as teacher and pupil" and "either eight or eleven teachers perecede Dhammadeva as the ninth or twelfth teacher at the end of the lineage."

The inscriptions lists two spiritual lineages (succession from teacher-disciple) of Buddhist monks who commissioned the construction. Each has only around a dozen of teacher-disciple 'generations' separating them from the founder of the religion.

Of interest is the explicit mention of Bahusrutiya, a very early evidence of the existence of this school of Buddhism.

The six line 'inscription 1' on the Deorkothar pillar has been publicised to be the earliest mention of the Buddha, which has been erroneously reinterpreted by some journalists as a proof of his existence. This is baseless, as the text contains nothing about the Buddha, only a mere mention of him as the first teacher:

"The inscriptions do not give us facts about the Buddha, or any proof that he existed, but they offer moving and detailed objective insights into early Buddhist history, independent of the textual tradition. That is about as good as it gets..."

However, Skilling and von Hinüber ventured to infer the datation of Buddha from the Deorkothar inscriptions, or rather from their estimate of periods elapsed between the 'generations' of the lineages listed therein. They concluded that the Buddha's death could not have taken place earlier than about 400-380 BCE.

== See also ==
- Decline of Buddhism in India
- Buddhism in India
- Buddhist architecture
- Bharhut
- Sanchi
- Recently found Buddhist remains in region near Bharhut and Sanchi
