= Sanchi Stupa No. 2 =

Stupa in Madhya Pradesh, India

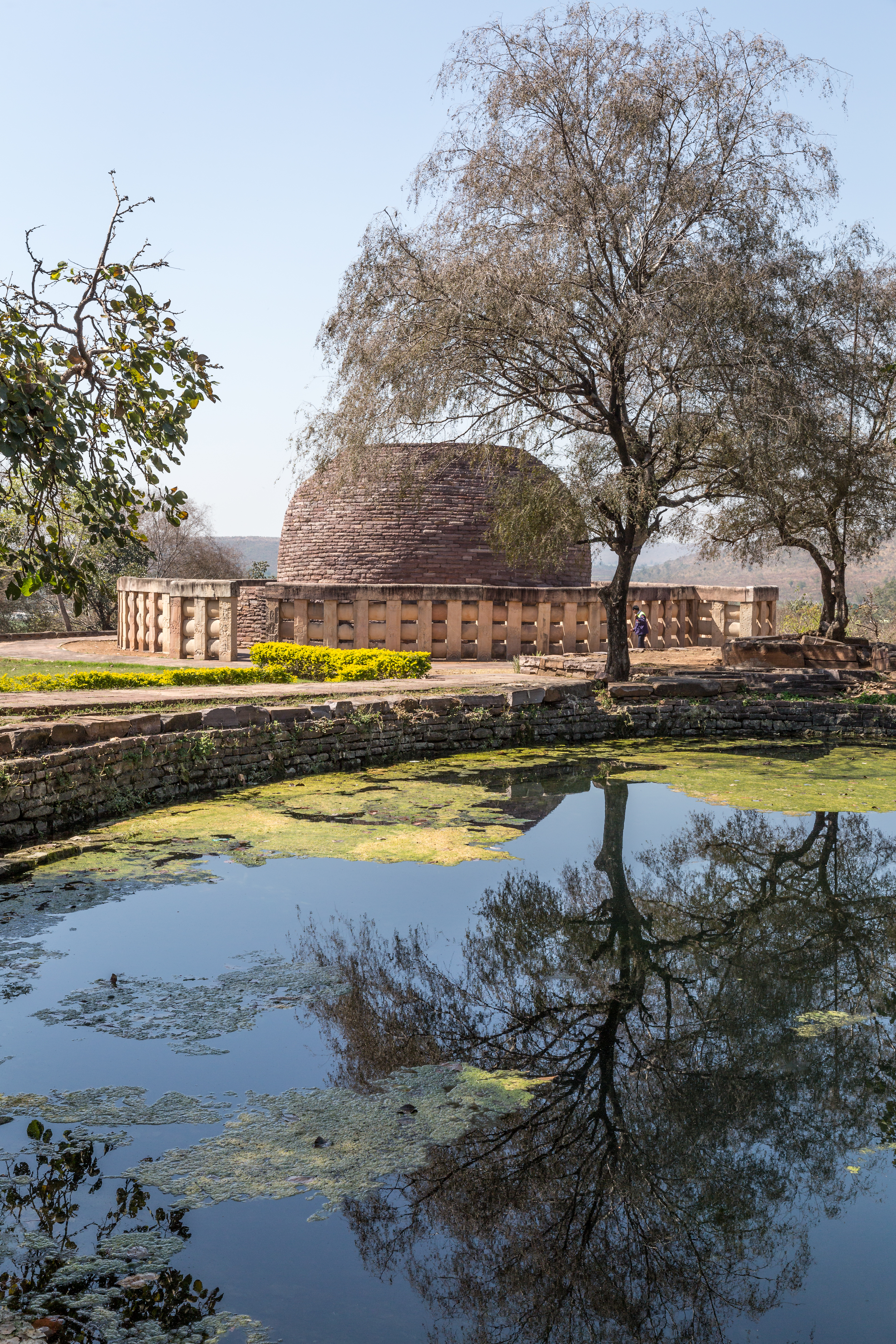
- Stupa number 2 at Sanchi

- Stupa II at Sanchi Sanchi Stupa No. 2 (Madhya Pradesh)

General information
- Type: Stupa
- Architectural style: Buddhist
- Location: Sanchi Town, Madhya Pradesh, India
- Coordinates: 23.48°N 77.73°E
- Construction started: 2nd century BCE

UNESCO World Heritage Site
- Part of: Buddhist Monuments at Sanchi
- Criteria: Cultural: (i)(ii)(iii)(iv)(vi)
- Reference: 524
- Inscription: 1989 (13th Session)

The Stupa No. 2 at Sanchi, also called Sanchi II, is one of the oldest existing Buddhist stupas in India, and part of the Buddhist complex of Sanchi in Madhya Pradesh. Following excavations in 1851, a relic box was discovered containing four smaller reliquaries. It is of particular interest since it has the earliest known important displays of decorative reliefs in India alongside the reliefs of Bharhut. It displays what has been called "the oldest extensive stupa decoration in existence".

== Overview ==
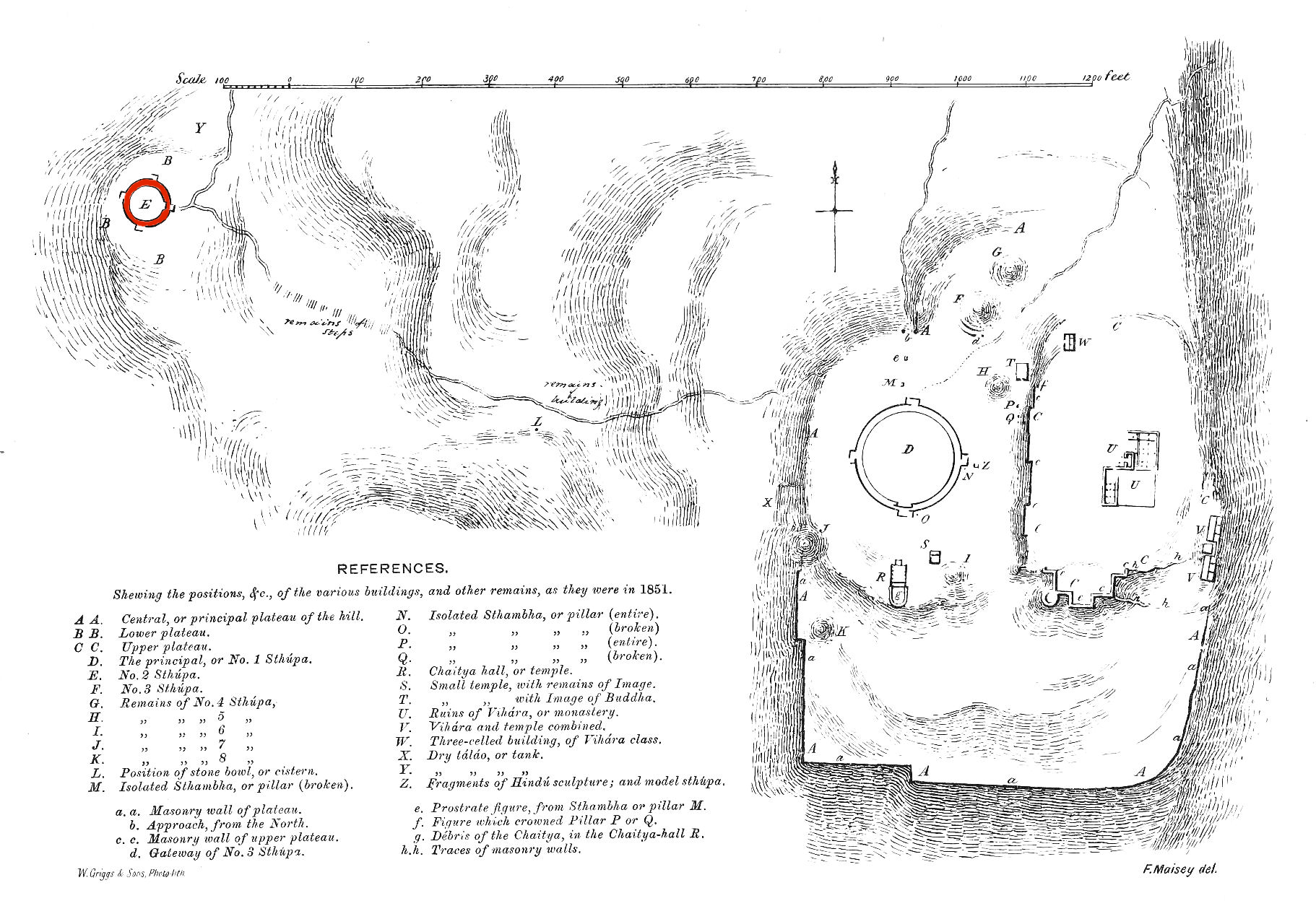
Map of Sanchi hill, with Stupa II at the extreme left, to the west

Stupa No. 2 is located in the Buddhist complex of Sanchi, 400 yards to the west of The Great Stupa (Sanchi Stupa No. 1). The second stupa is notable for its sculptural program, which is considered unique by archaeologists and scholars.

Several means of dating Sanchi Stupa No. 2 have been proposed. It is accepted that Stupa No. 2 was created later than The Great Stupa. The reliquary inscriptions have been compared to those of the Heliodorus pillar, which is datable to circa 113 BCE due to its establishment during the rule of Indo-Greek Antialcidas. An examination of the figures contained in the reliquaries, who were contemporaries with the Mauryan king Asoka, suggest a date within the Mauryan epoch. This is complicated by the fact that the relics could have been moved around before being interred at Sanchi, meaning that the stupa could postdate the Mauryans. Another means of dating the stupa have concentrated around its many carvings and whether they reflect foreign-inspired or indigenous styles.

The Stupa is located outside of the main complex of Sanchi on the slope of Sanchi hill. It stands on a small, artificially constructed terrace rather than the hill itself so that it is slightly lower than The Great Stupa. This is thought to be because the relics contained in Sanchi Stupa No. 2 are those of ten Buddhist saints of lower importance than the Buddha and his chief disciples, whose relics were intended for The Great Stupa and the third stupa respectively. Since its rediscovery in 1822, the Stupa's terrace has been reconstructed due to its half-destroyed state. The dome was also destroyed following excavations in 1822 and 1851, but restoration work was completed in the early 20th century.

== Relics ==
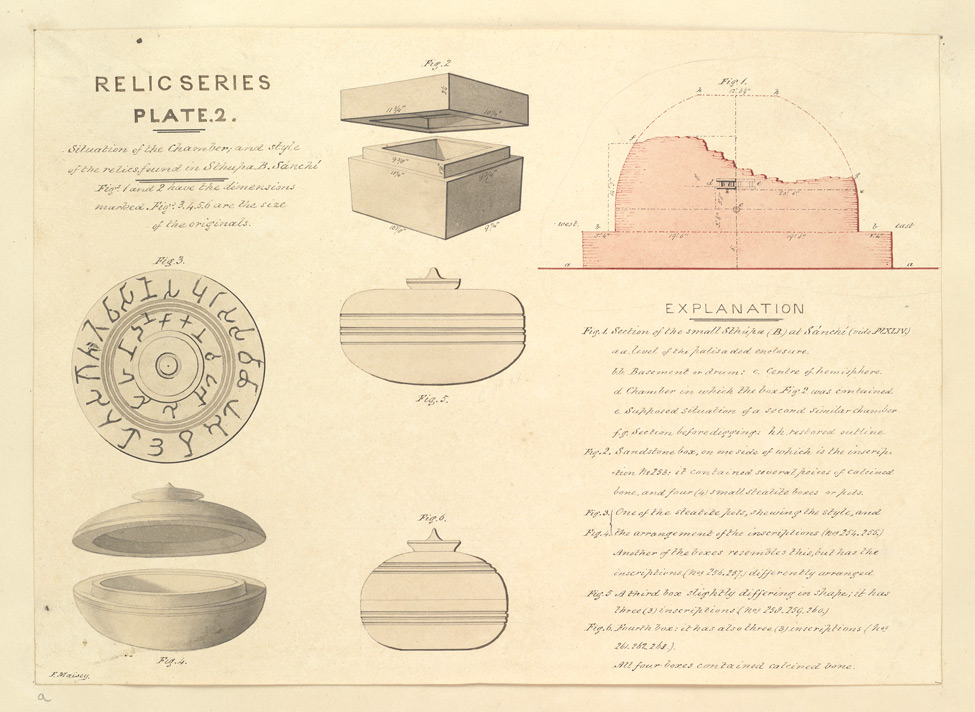
Illustrated cross-section of Sanchi Stupa No. 2 with relic box and reliquaries

In a chamber within Sanchi Stupa No. 2, a white sandstone relic box was discovered, measuring 11 inches long, 9 1/2 inches wide and 9 1/2 inches tall. Within this relic box, four small caskets of mottled steatite were found, containing small amounts of burnt human bone.

The relic box is inscribed in the Brahmi script, however the language is thought to be Prakrit. The inscription reads "[Relics] of all teachers including venerable Kāsapagota and venerable Vāchi-Suvijayita the teacher" according to one translation by indologist Michael Willis. Willis also posits that the decision to include these specific names on the outer box was due to them being the oldest and most recent of the figures contained in the reliquaries respectively, thus acting as a "bracket" that encompassed all individuals.

Each of the four containers found inside the relic box also contain inscriptions, declaring the names of those enshrined inside. These men are ten saints who either participated in the Third Buddhist Council held under Ashoka, or were sent as emissaries to the Himalayas to preach the Buddhist doctrine. Among them is a "Mogaliputa", who may be Mogaliputa Tissa, who presided the Third Buddhist Council, but this is disputed. The remains of the relic box and the four caskets are split betwen the collections of the British Museum and the Victoria and Albert Museum.

== Relief and sculptural program ==
Sanchi Stupa No. 2 is highly decorated, with many carved pillars making up an ellipitcal "railing" or balustrade surrounding the stupa, perforated by four entrances in the cardinal directions. Another ring of decorated pillars creates a balustrade around the base on which the stupa sits. The stairs used to ascend this base also have carved railings. Unlike The Great Stupa, the entrances have no monumental gates, or torana, however the pillars making up these entrances are more elaborately decorated than those composing of the balustrade. The ornamentation on the balustrade pillars consists mainly of medallions and demi-medallions in low relief, however the entrance pillars have sculptured sections.

The dating of the stupa on the basis of its decoratve program is made complex by there being a variety of styles of carvings. The stupa's carvings are particularly noteworthy because they are considered to be an early example of indigenous Indian stone-carving, separate from the imperial and more foreign work of the Mauryan empire. This post-Mauryan style, which is characterized by low relief, flat features and angular outlines draws from the sculptures of Bharhut to define its parameters. Although the dating of Bharhut is unclear, scholars have proposed a date of 150 BC. Methods for dating the carvings of Sanchi Stupa No. 2 are done on the basis of relating its style to the art of Bharhut, and thus a general date of the last quarter of the second century BC is proposed although it is established that work was completed over an extended period of time.

=== Early period (circa 115 BCE) ===
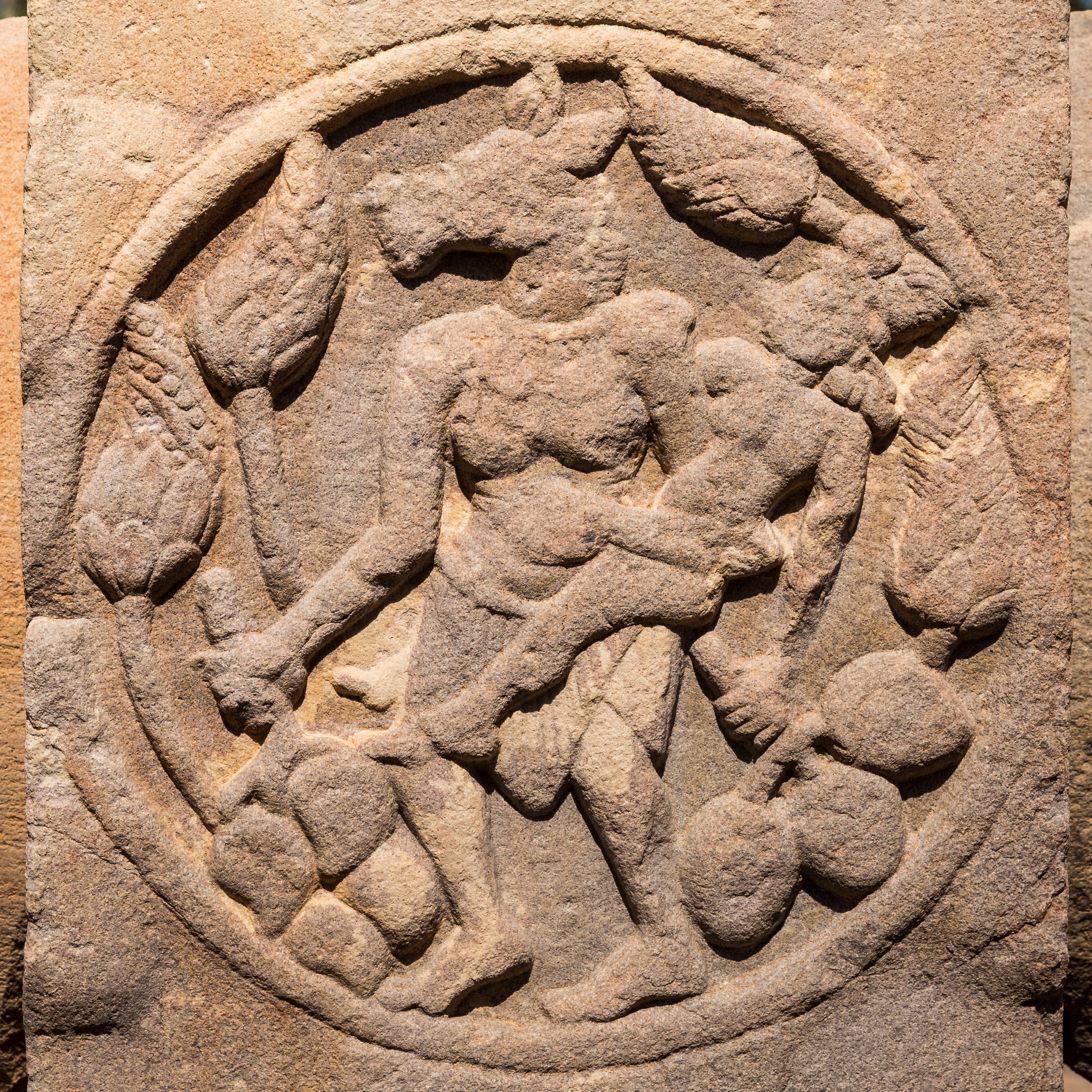
The relief of the horse-headed ogress in Sanchi Stupa No.2.

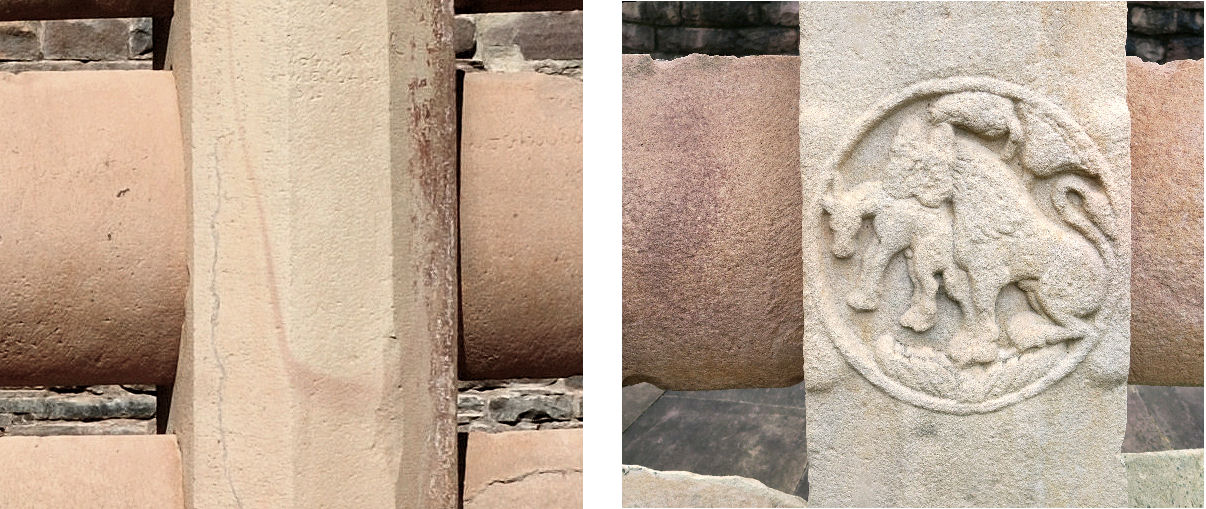
Sunga period railings were initially blank (left: Sanchi Great Stupa), and only started to be decorated circa 115 BCE with Stupa No.2 (right).

These first attempts at narrative art are aniconic, as they do not represent the Buddha directly, but only his appearance in previous lives, or his symbols.

These are altogether 455 medallions and half-medallions, or which 293 consist in lotus flowers, and 126 in a lotus with another motif. Only 36 of the medallions have another subject. For the first time, clearly Buddhist themes are represented, particularly the four events in the life of the Buddha that are: the Nativity, the Enlightenment, the First Sermon and the Decease. Some authors consider these reliefs as the prelude (the "prolegomenon") of the iconography of the reliefs in Bharhut (100-80 BCE) and of the later and much more evolved depictions on the toranas of the Great Stupa in Sanchi (1st century BCE/CE).

==== Influence from the northwest ====
It is thought that the earliest reliefs from the last quarter of the 2nd century BCE were produced by craftsmen from the area of Gandhara in northwestern Indian, a central Indo-Greek region, because they left mason's marks in Kharoshthi (a script used around the area of Gandhara), as opposed to the local Brahmi script. This seems to imply that these foreign workers were responsible for some of the earliest and sometimes quite foreign motifs and figures that can be found on the railings of the stupa.

Around the time of the first reliefs at Stupa II, in 115 BCE, the embassy of Heliodorus from the Indo-Greek king of Taxila named Antialkidas, visited the court of the Sungas king Bhagabhadra in Vidisha, about 6 km away from Sanchi. In Vidisha, Heliodorus established the Heliodorus pillar in a dedication to Vāsudeva. This would indicate that relations between the Indo-Greeks and the Sungas had improved by that time, that people traveled between the two realms, and also that the Indo-Greeks readily followed Indian religions.

Early reliefs at Sanchi, Stupa No2 (circa 115 BC)
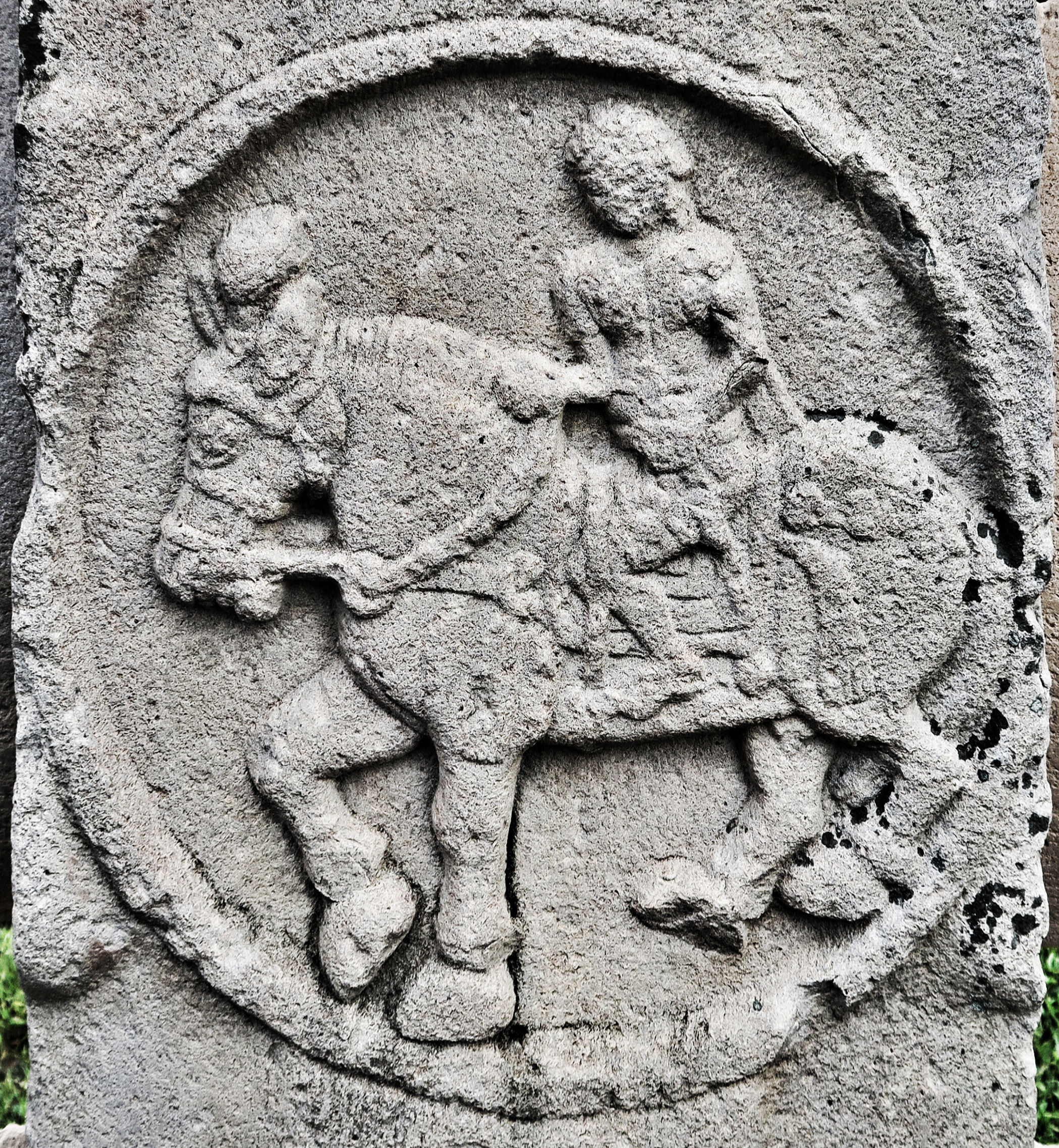
Foreigner on a horse. The medallions are dated circa 115 BC.

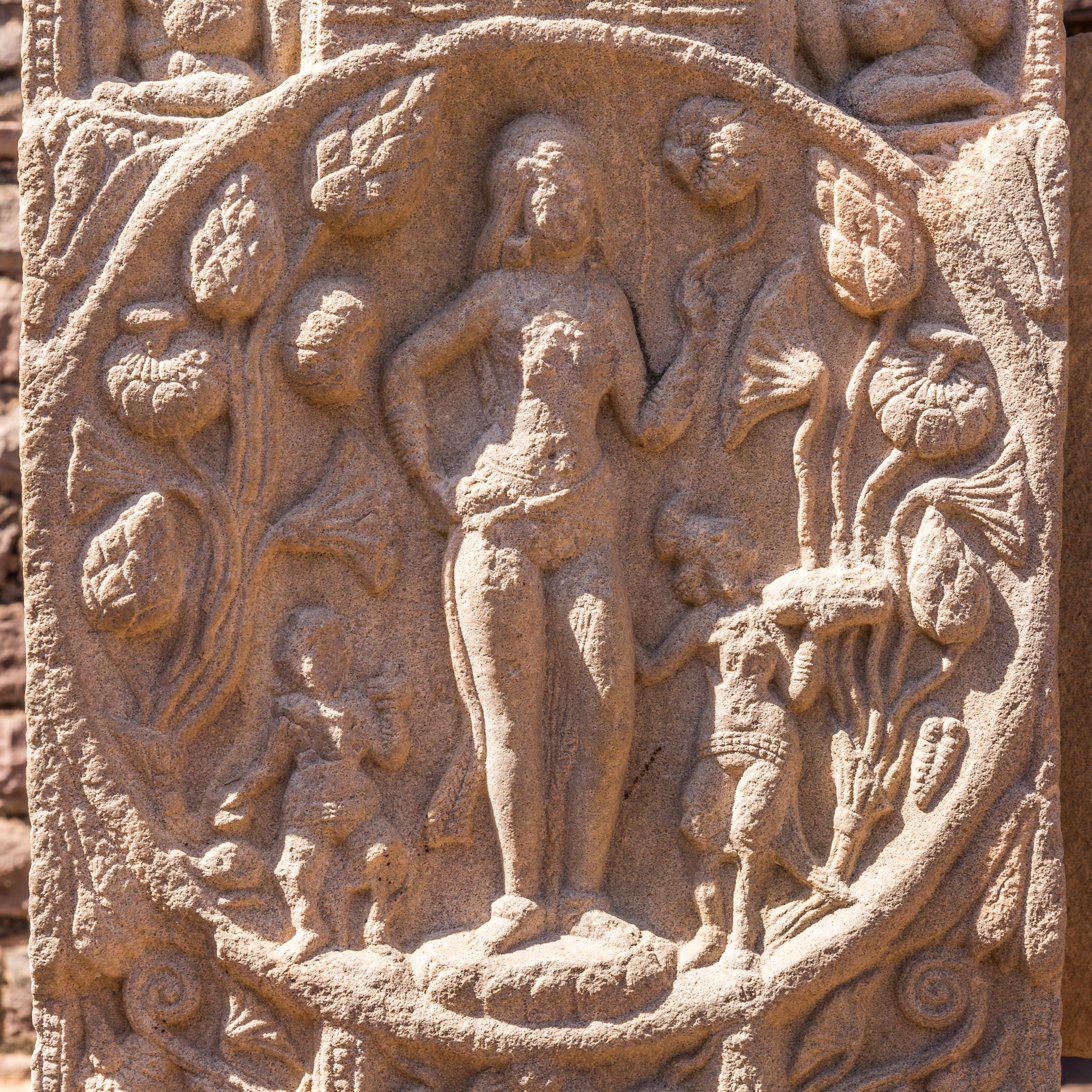
Lakshmi with lotus and two child attendants, probably derived from similar images of Venus

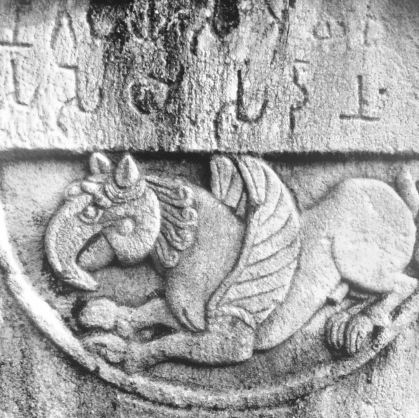
Griffin.

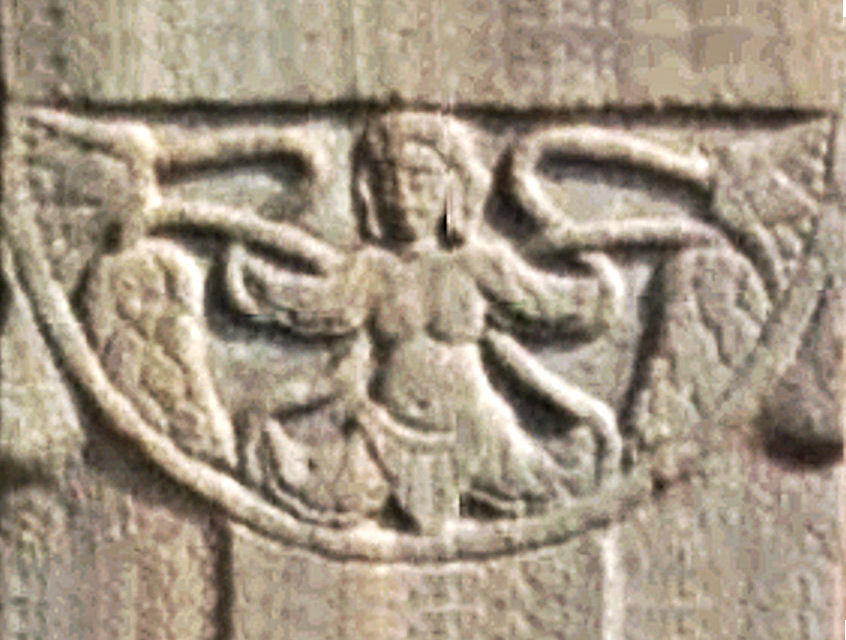
Anguipede, a Greek mythological figure.

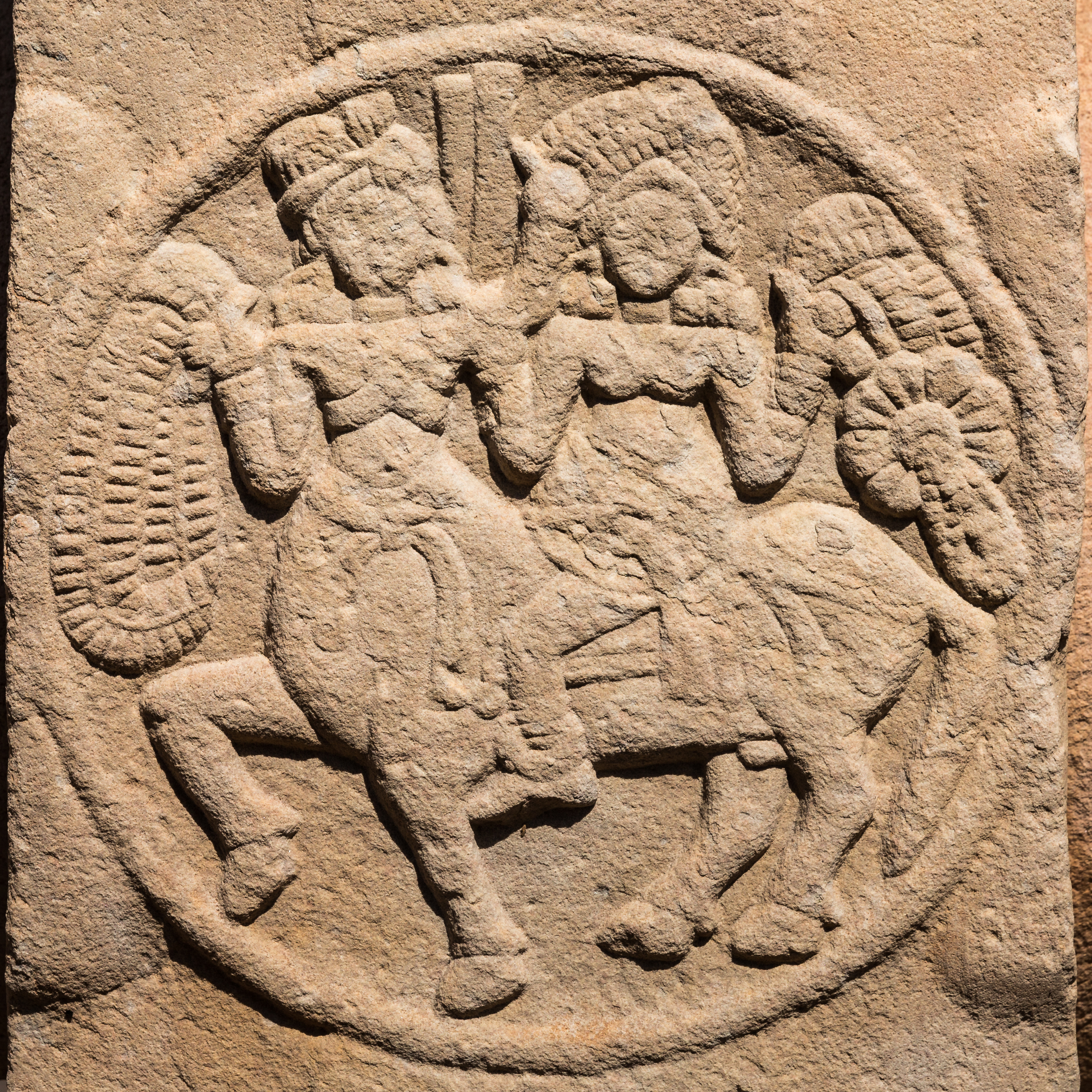
Female riding a Centaur. Centaurs are generally considered as Western borrowings.

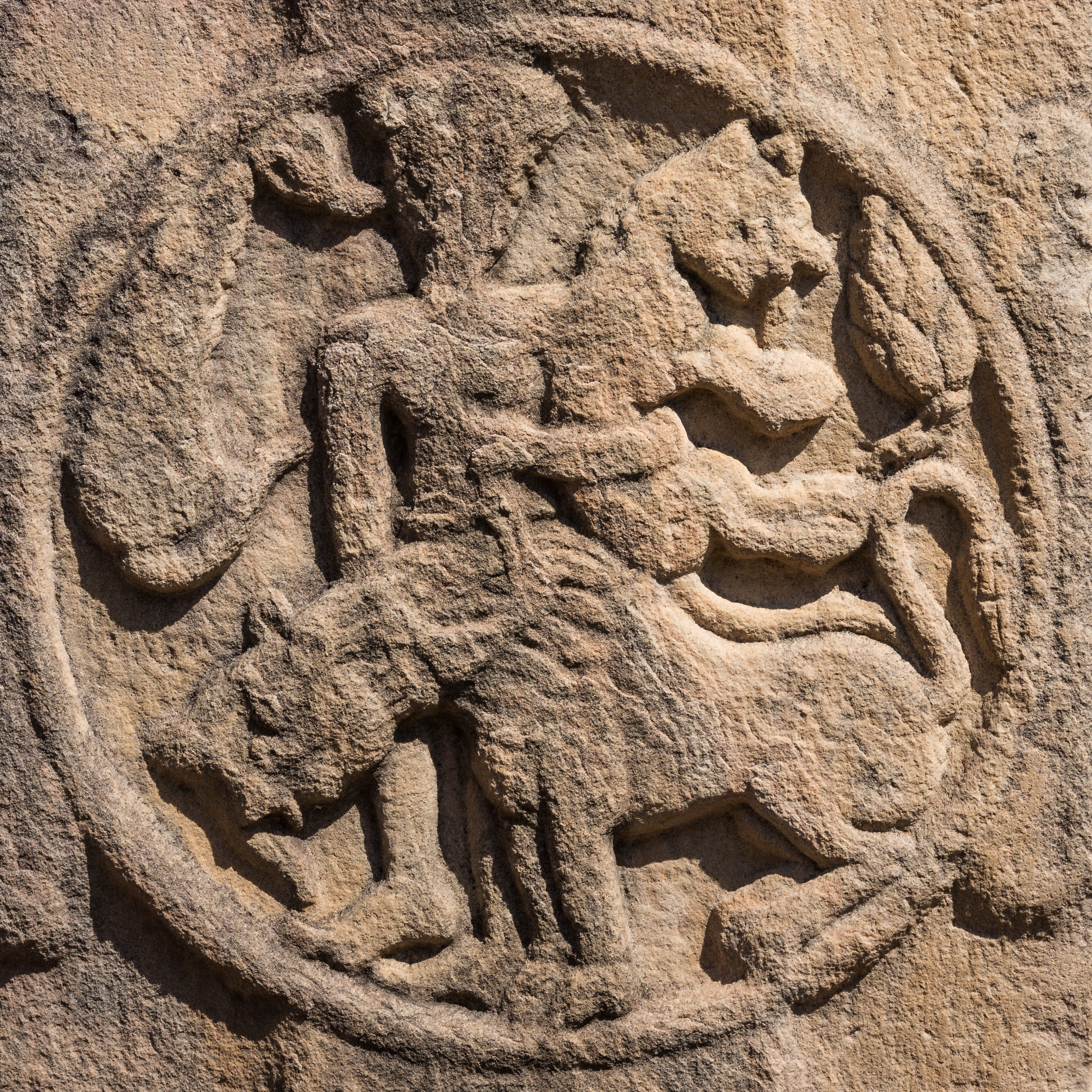
Hero fighting against lions, a motif of West-Asian origin, such as this one or this one.

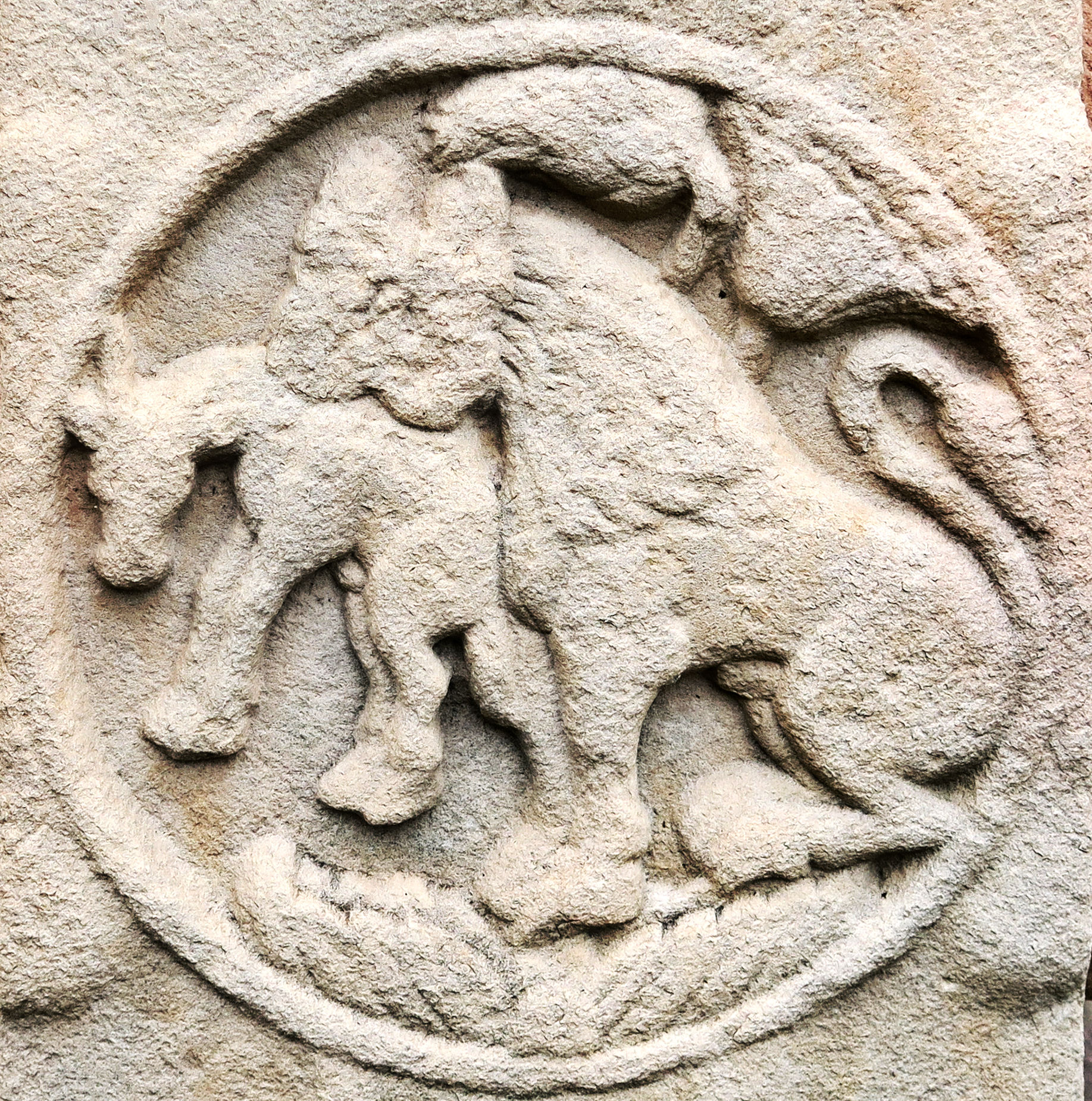
Lion with calf.

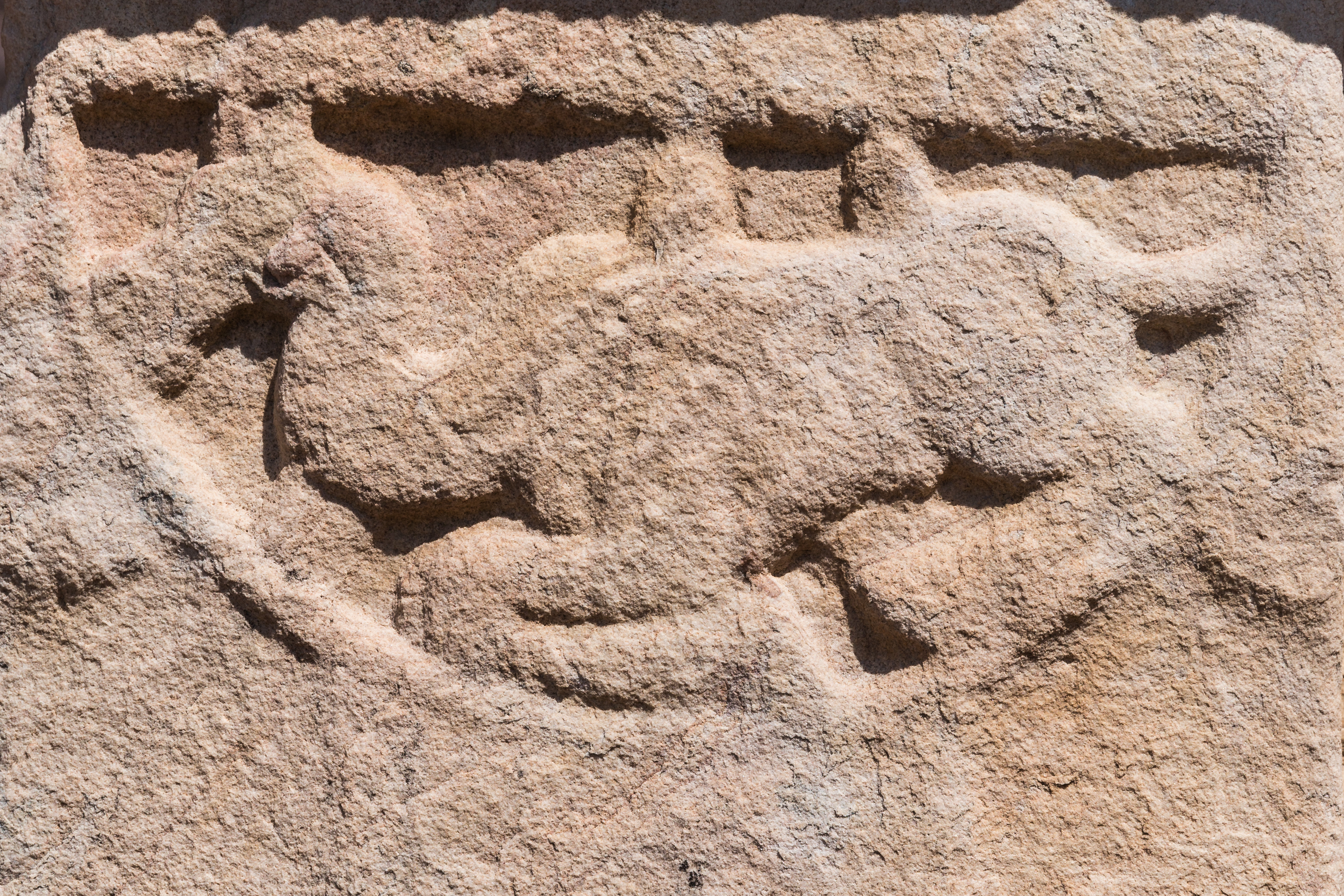
Bactrian camel.

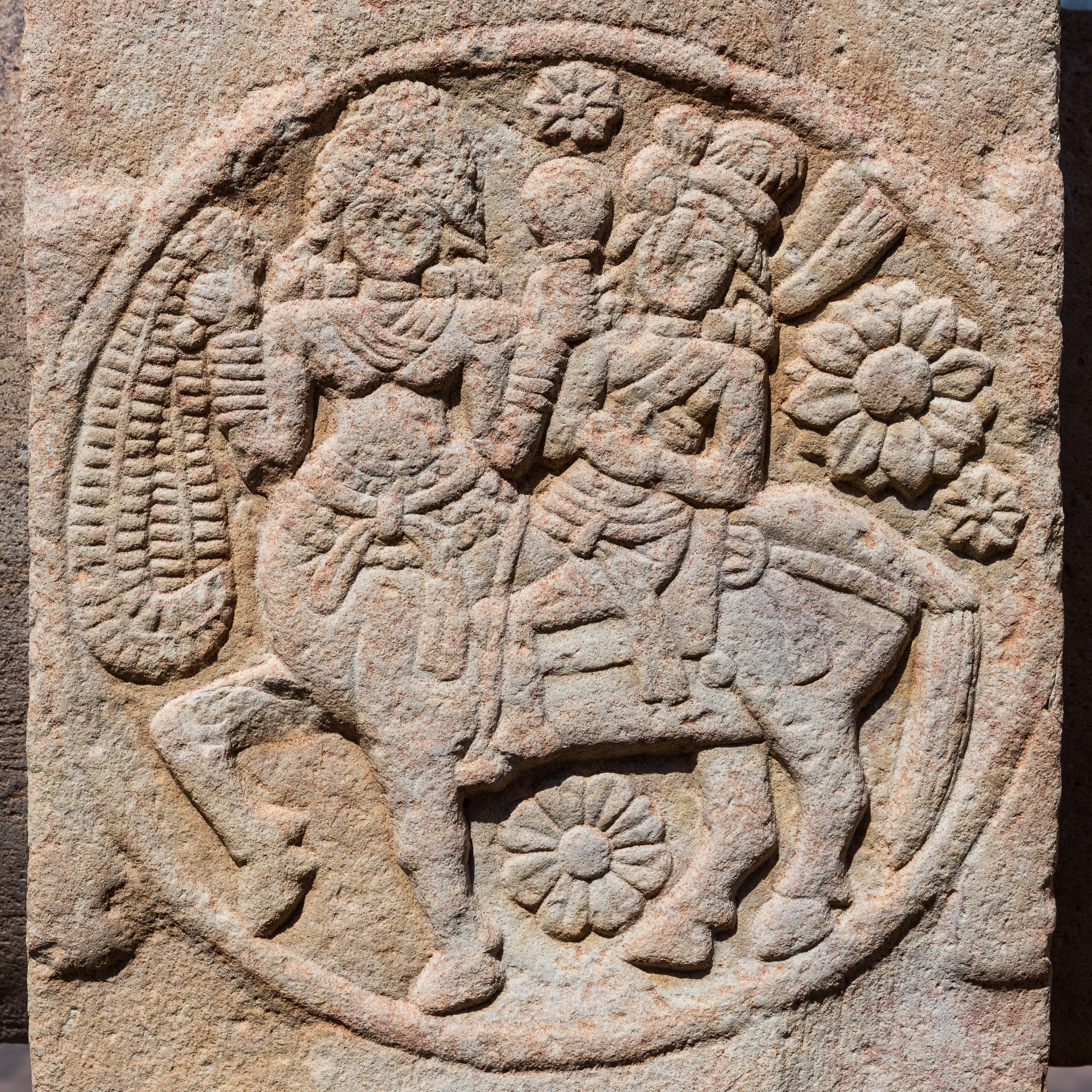
Man on a centaur.

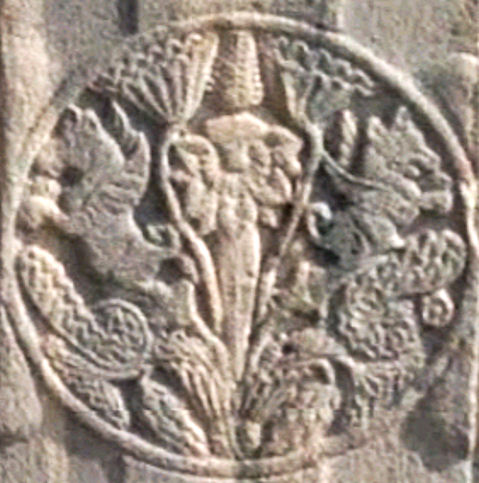
Symmetrical leaping winged lions among floral motifs.

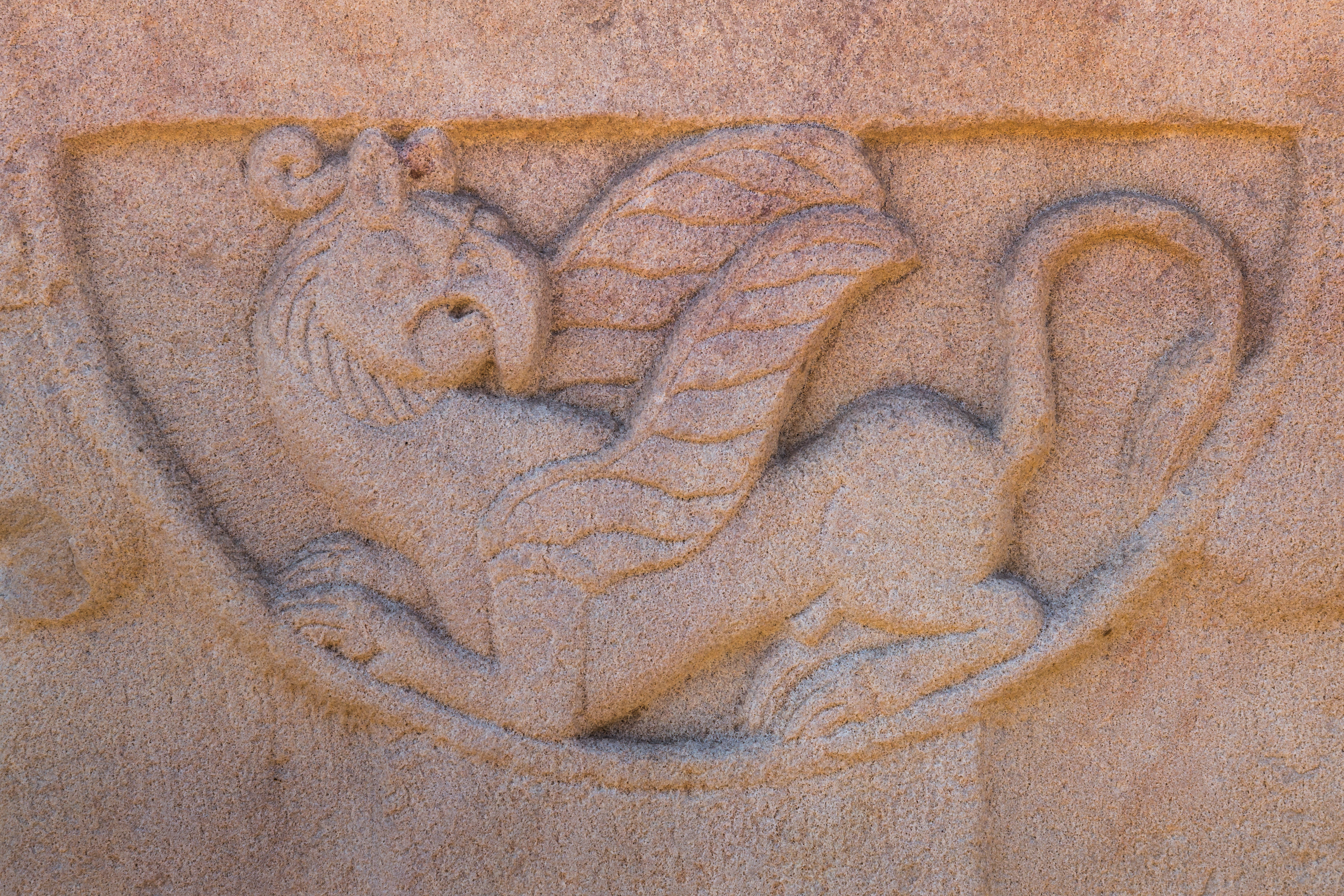
Winged griffin.

==== Floral designs ====
The vast majority of the oldest medallions and half-medallions (293 out of 455) simply consist of a lotus motif. A further 126 additional medallions and half medallions represent a lotus with another motif. Some motifs take on Hellenistic decorative forms.

Floral designs, Sanchi Stupa No2 (circa 115 BCE)
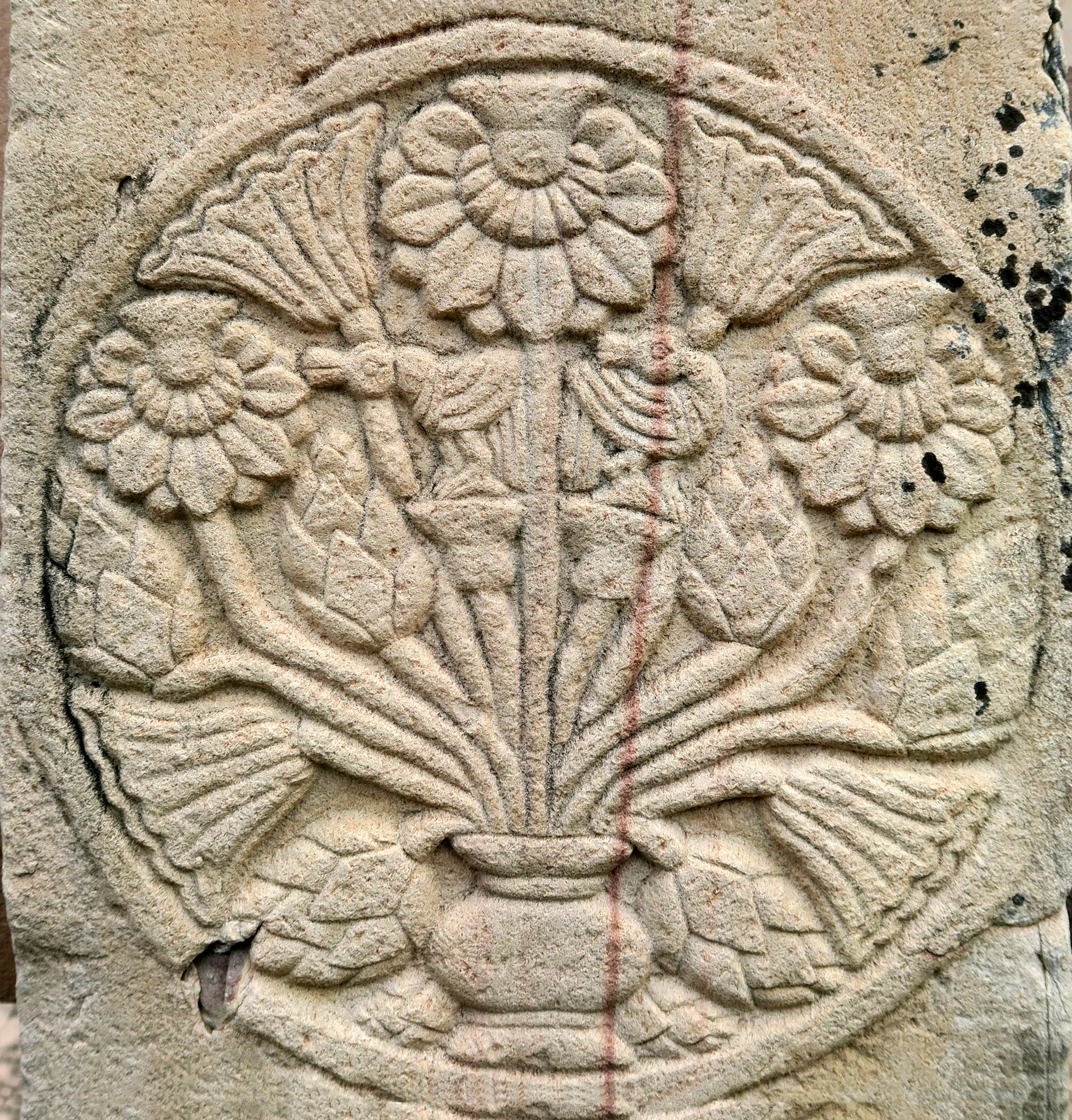
Floral designs.

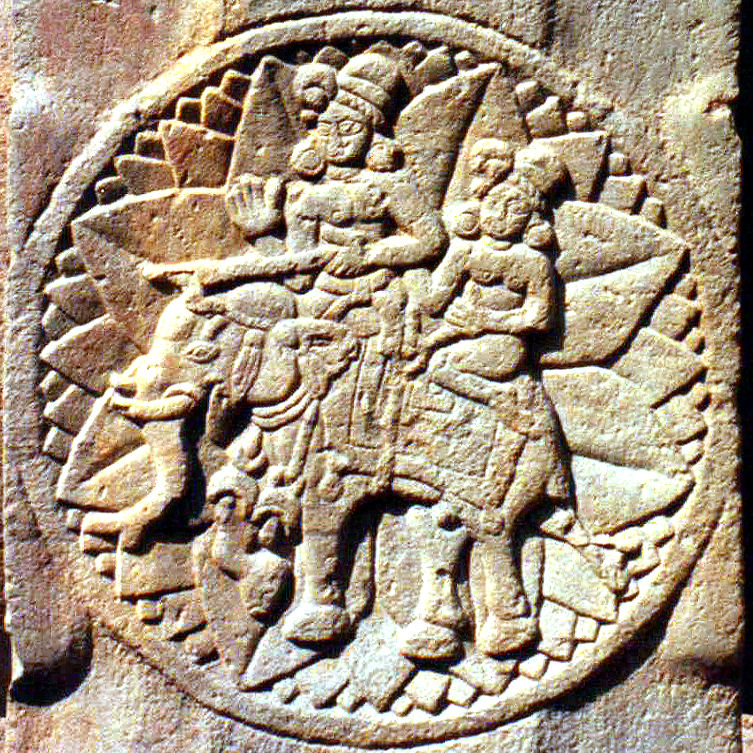
Elephant.

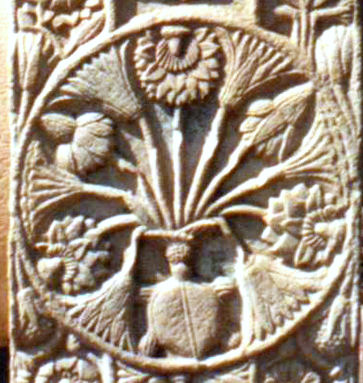
Flower medallion.

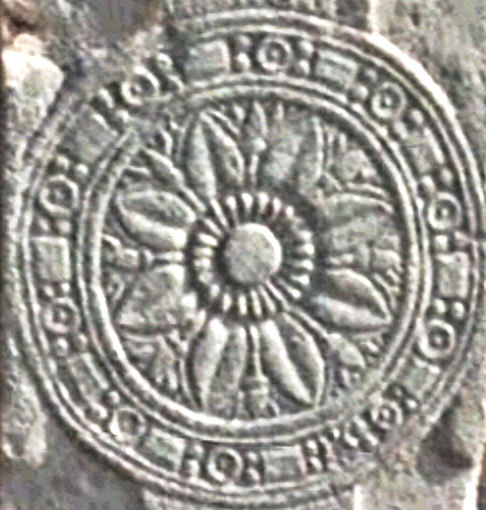
Medallion.

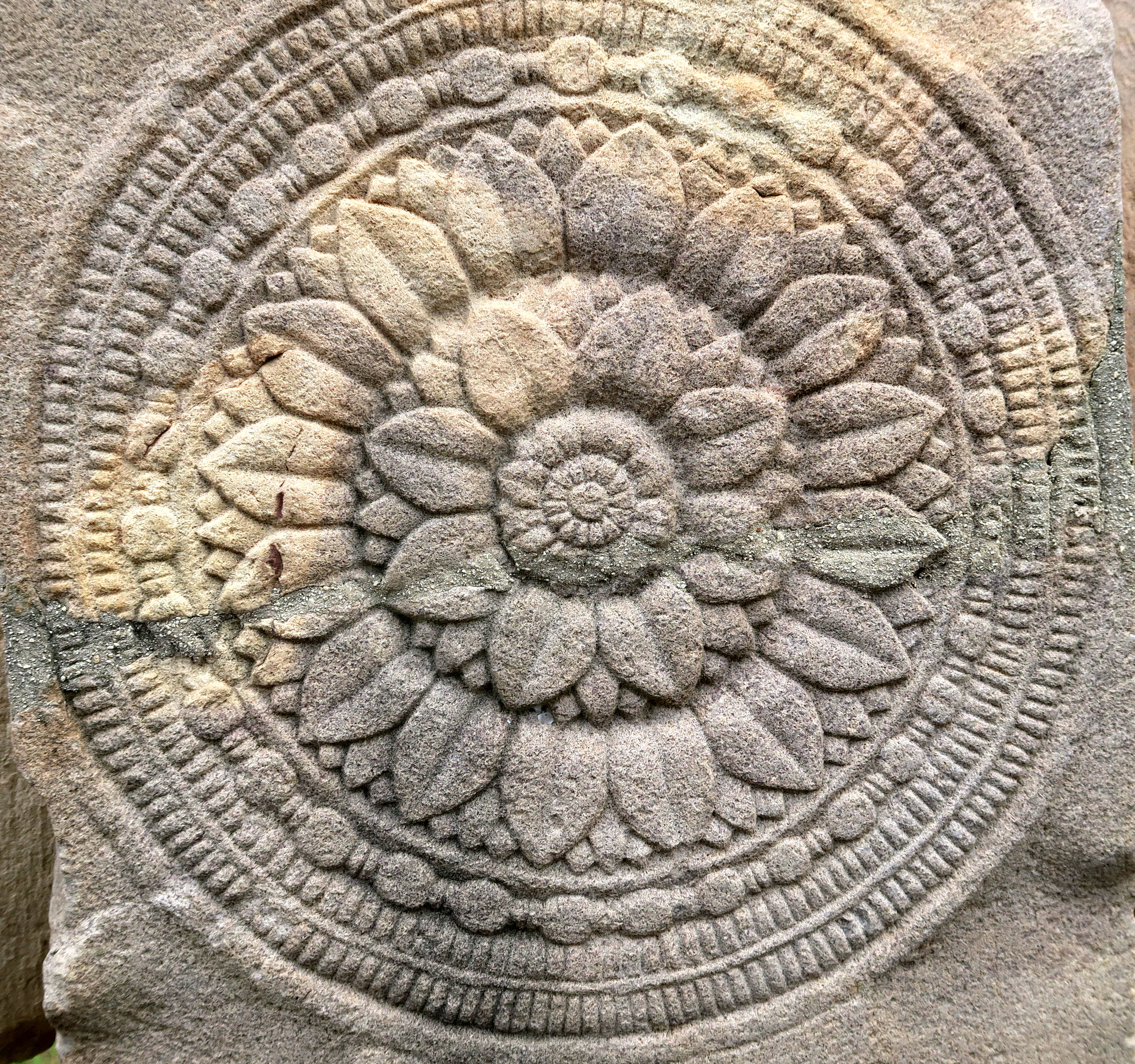
Lotus with Hellenistic Beads and reels motif.

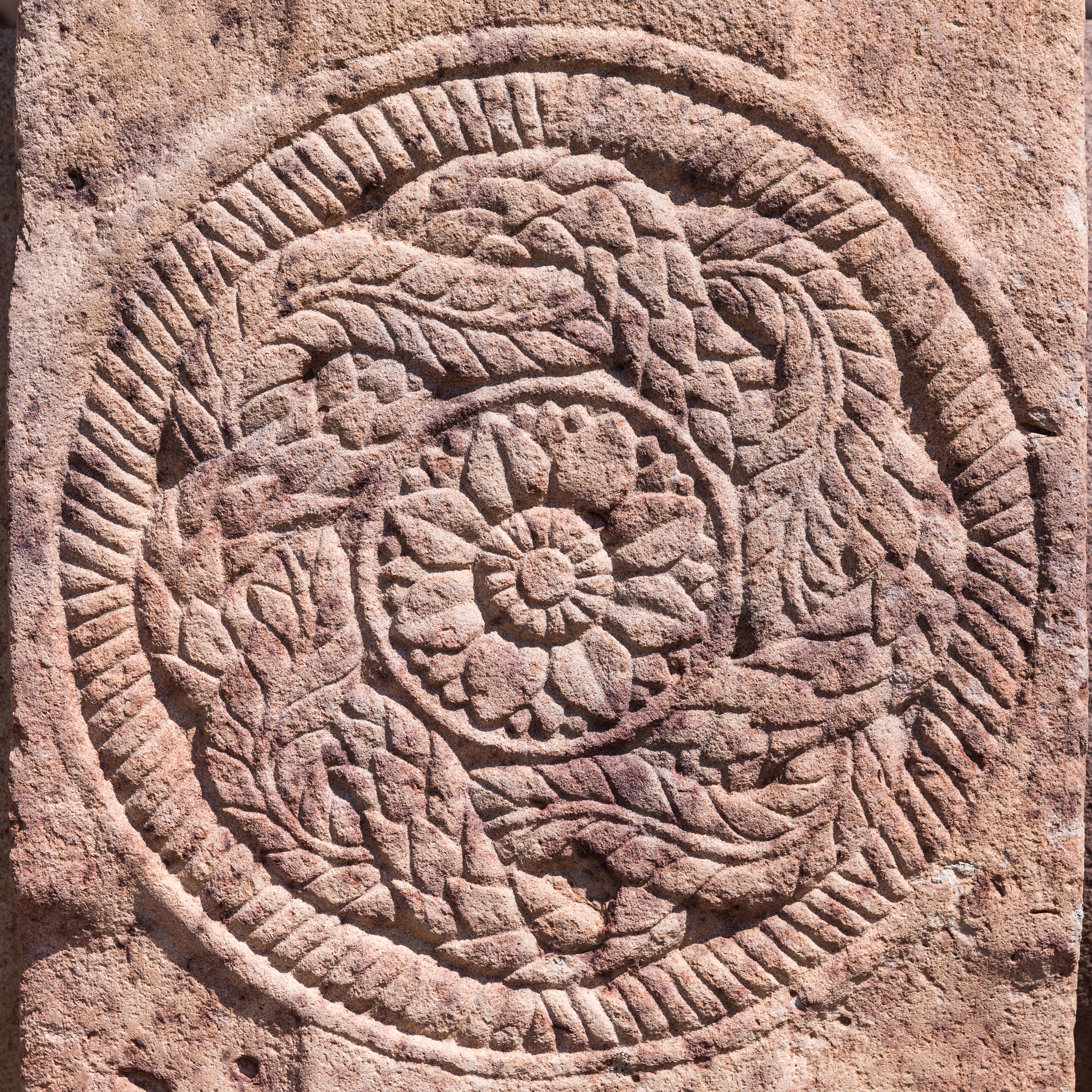
Lotus and guirland.

==== Buddhist symbols ====
Among the medallions, purely Buddhist symbols are quite rare. However, motifs of triratnas and palmettes (already visible in the Pataliputra capital, 3rd century BCE) appear in places, amidst multiple lotus motifs.

Buddhist symbols, Sanchi Stupa No2 (circa 115 BCE)
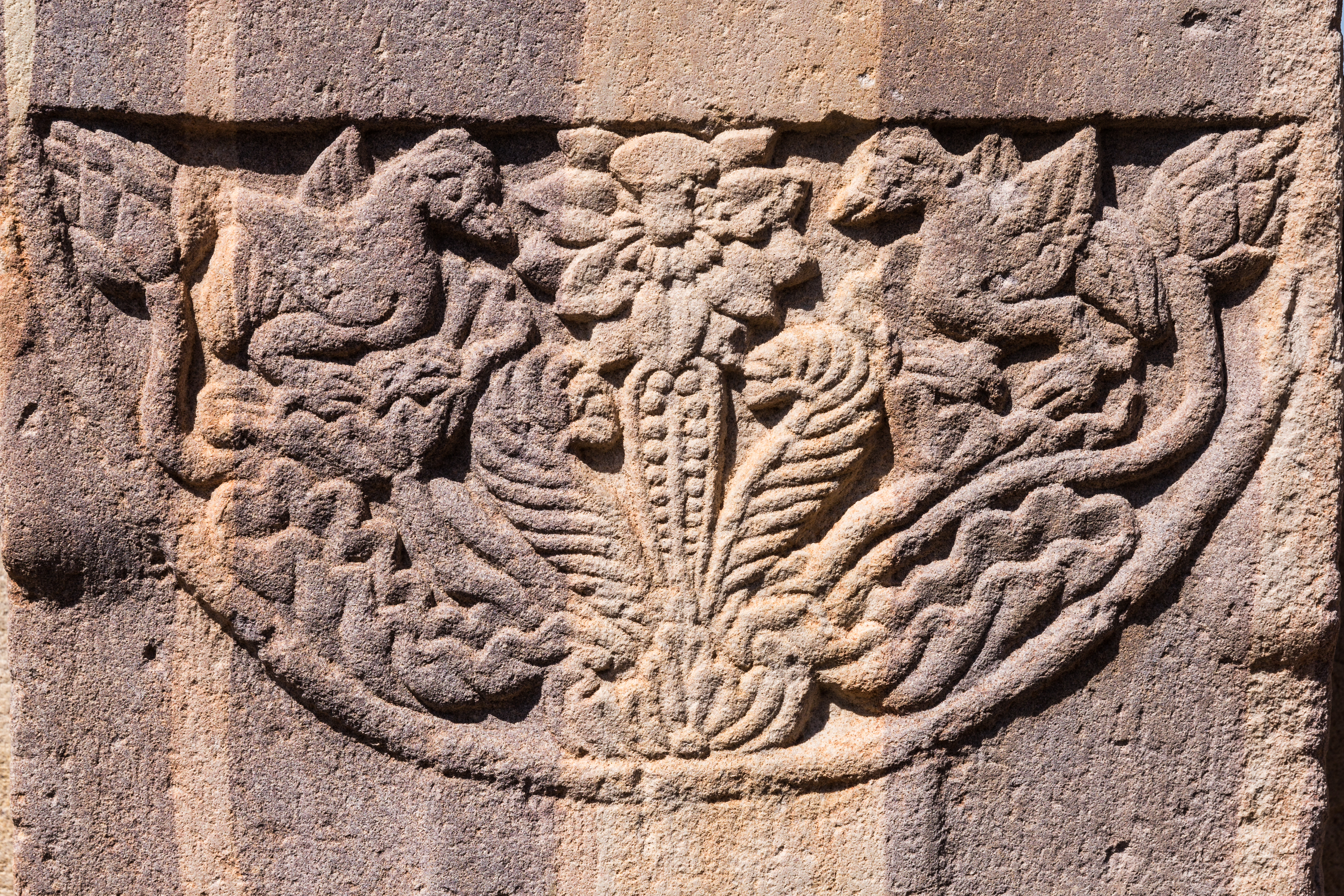
Palmette design, often present in early Buddhist decorations.

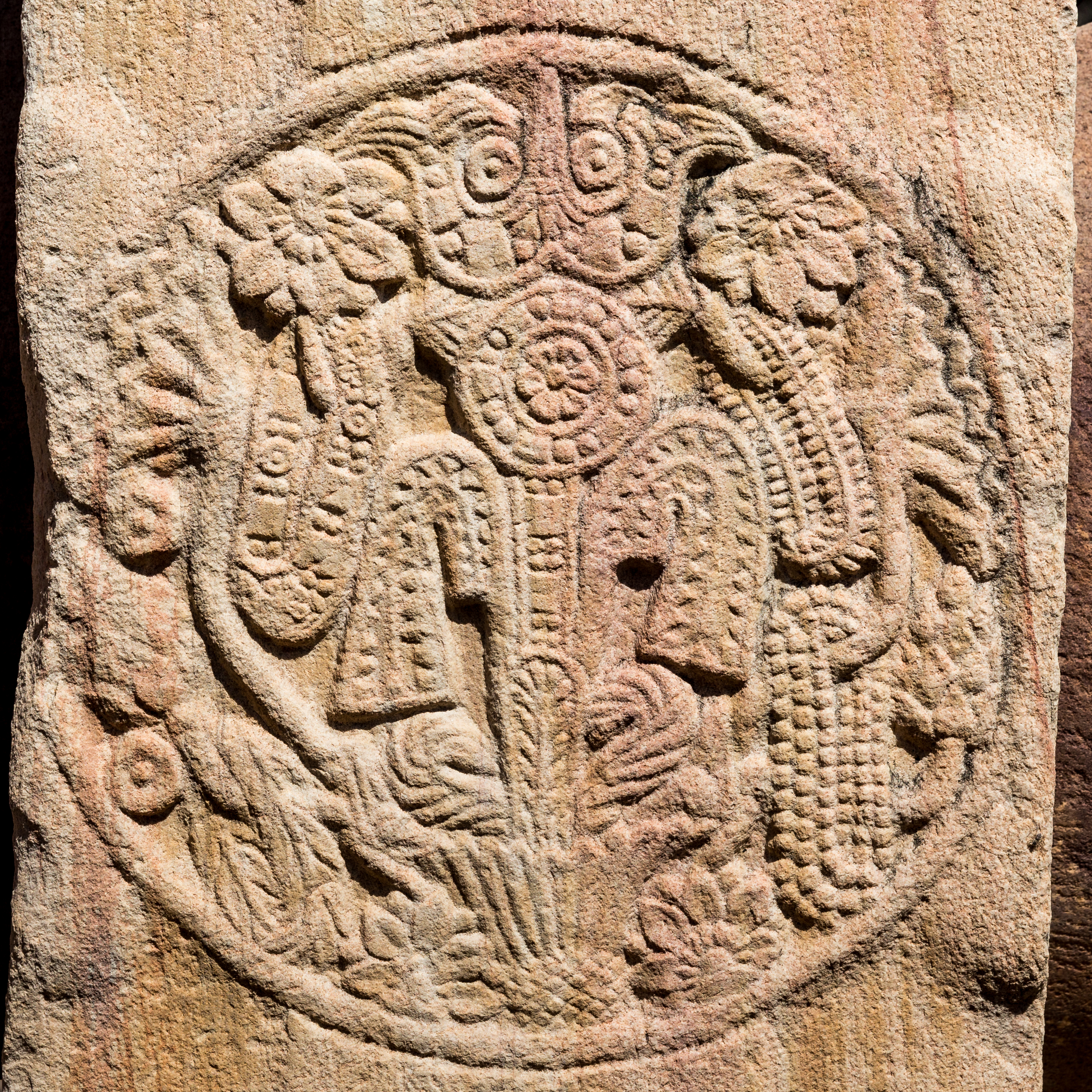
Triratna with decorative scrolls.

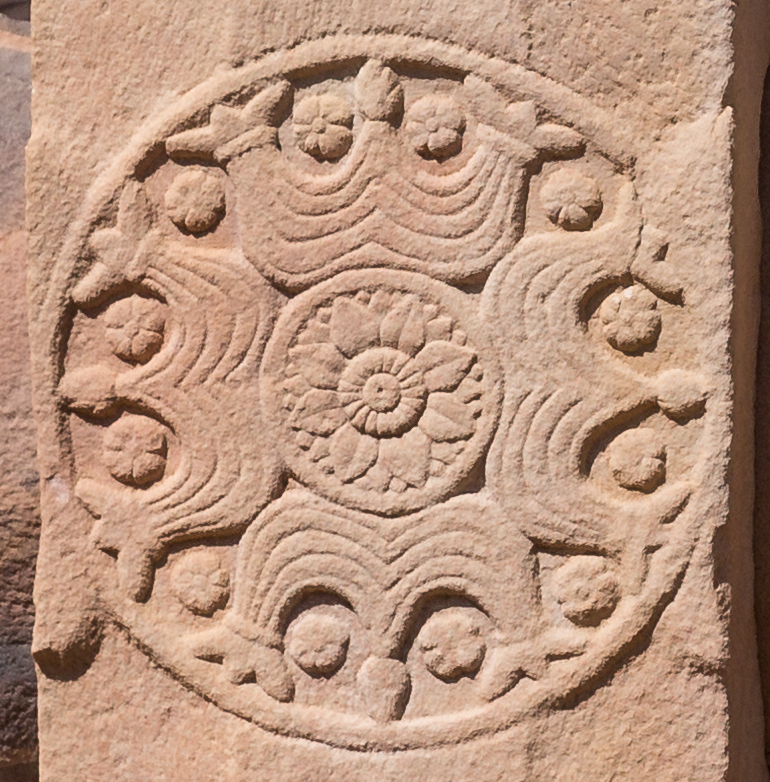
Motif based on triratnas.

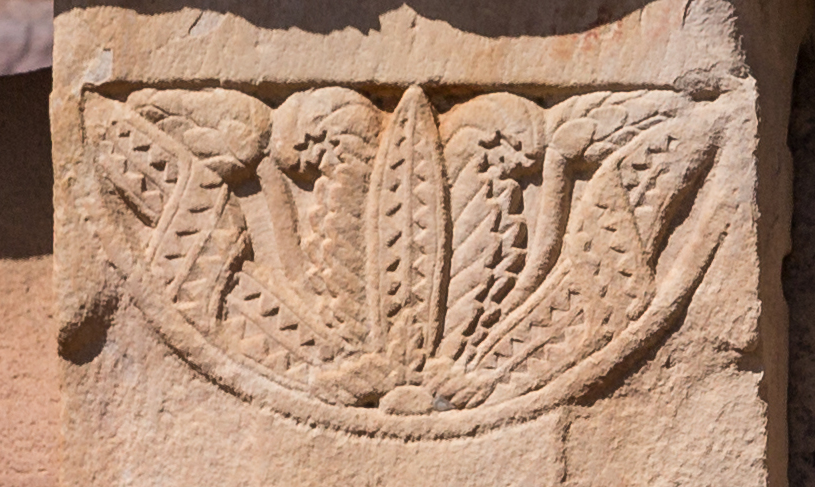
Palmette design.

=== Later period (circa 15 BCE) ===
About a century later, some more descriptive reliefs were added, and often superimposed on the earlier ones, which clearly show the evolution of Buddhist art during the intervening period. This time, the reliefs are much more Buddhist in character, and are contemporary with the reliefs on the torana gateways of the Great Stupa at Sanchi.

Later reliefs at Sanchi, Stupa No2 (circa 15 BC)
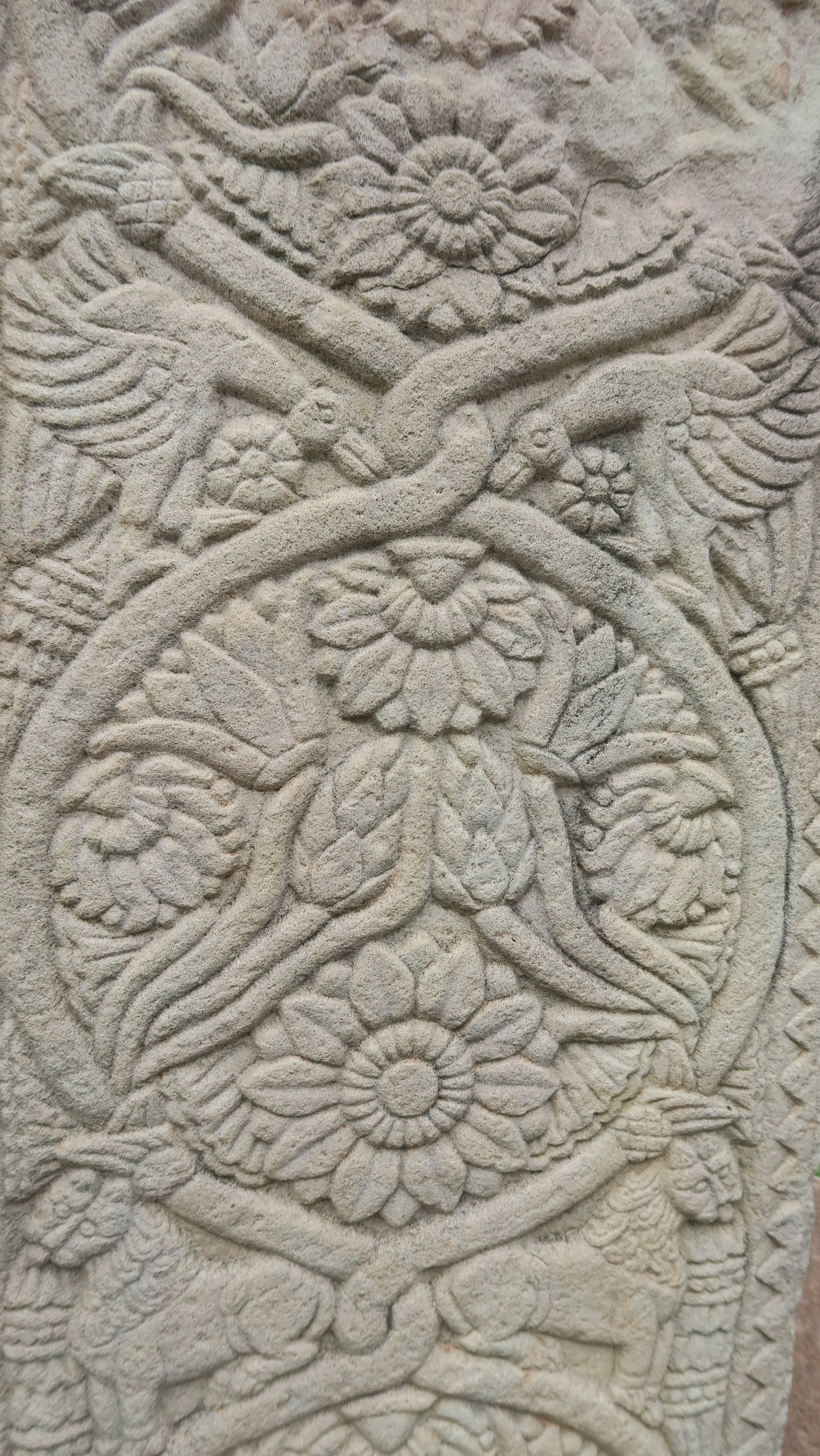
Floral frieze.

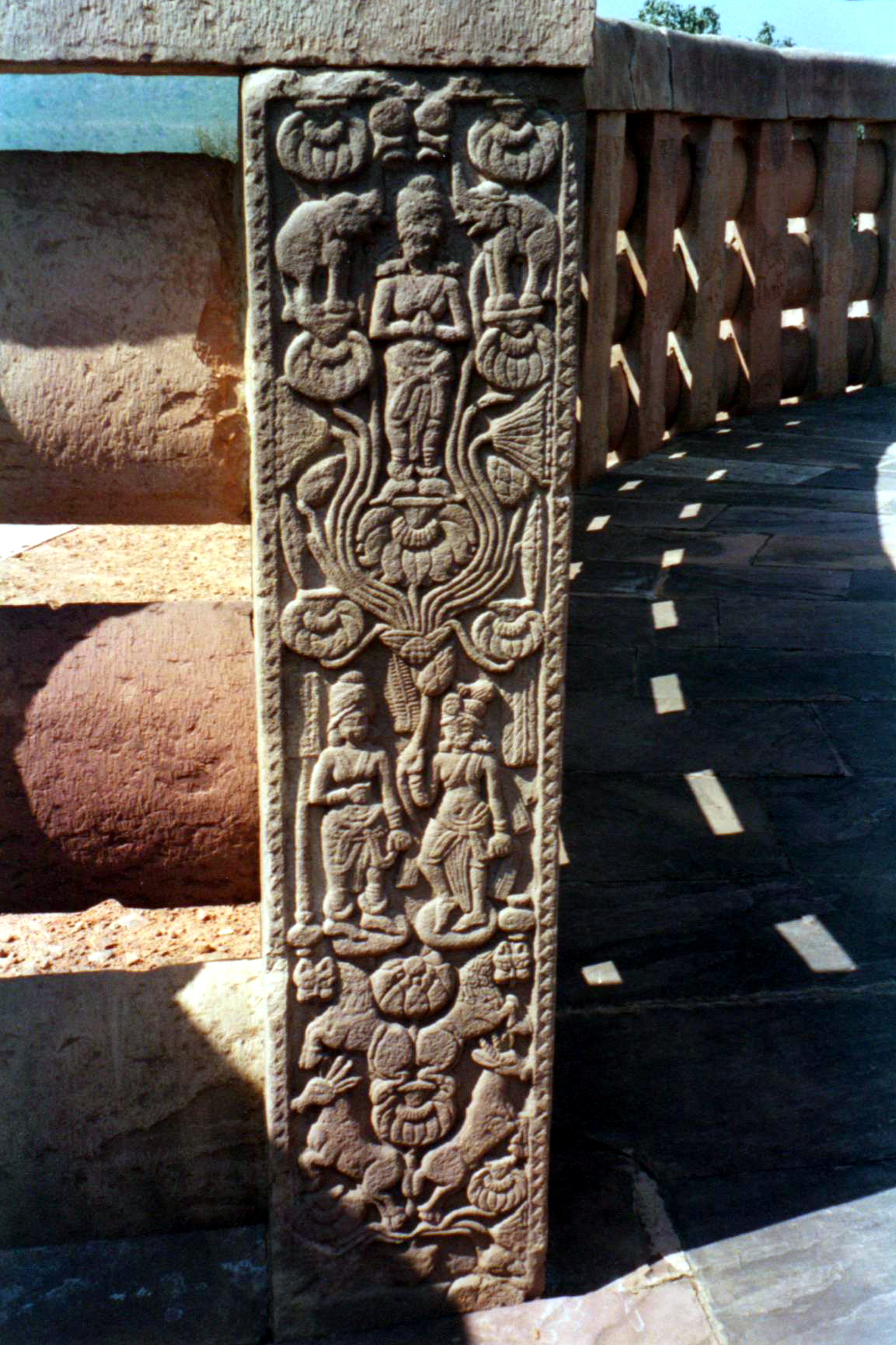
Decorative pillar.

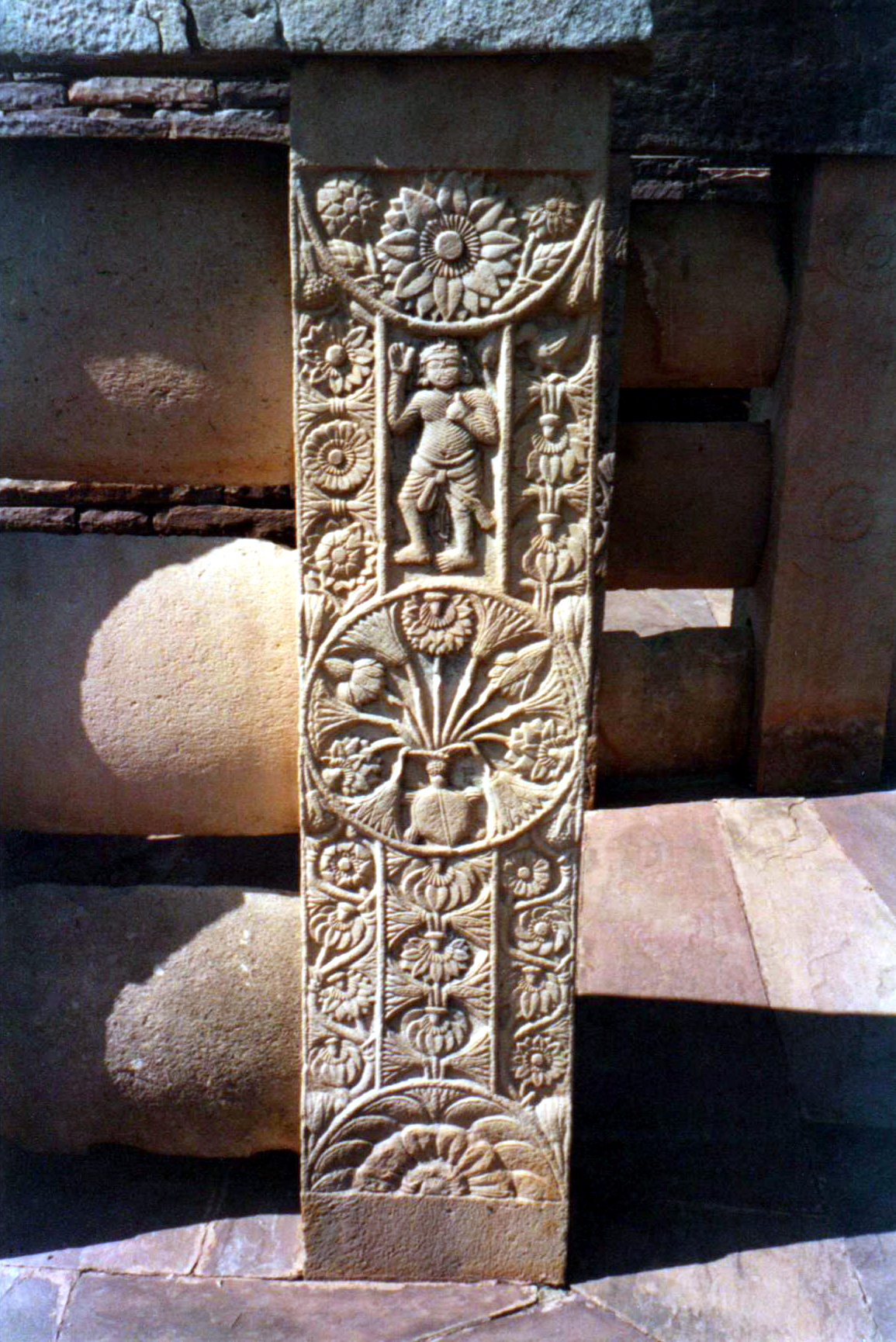
Decorative pillar.

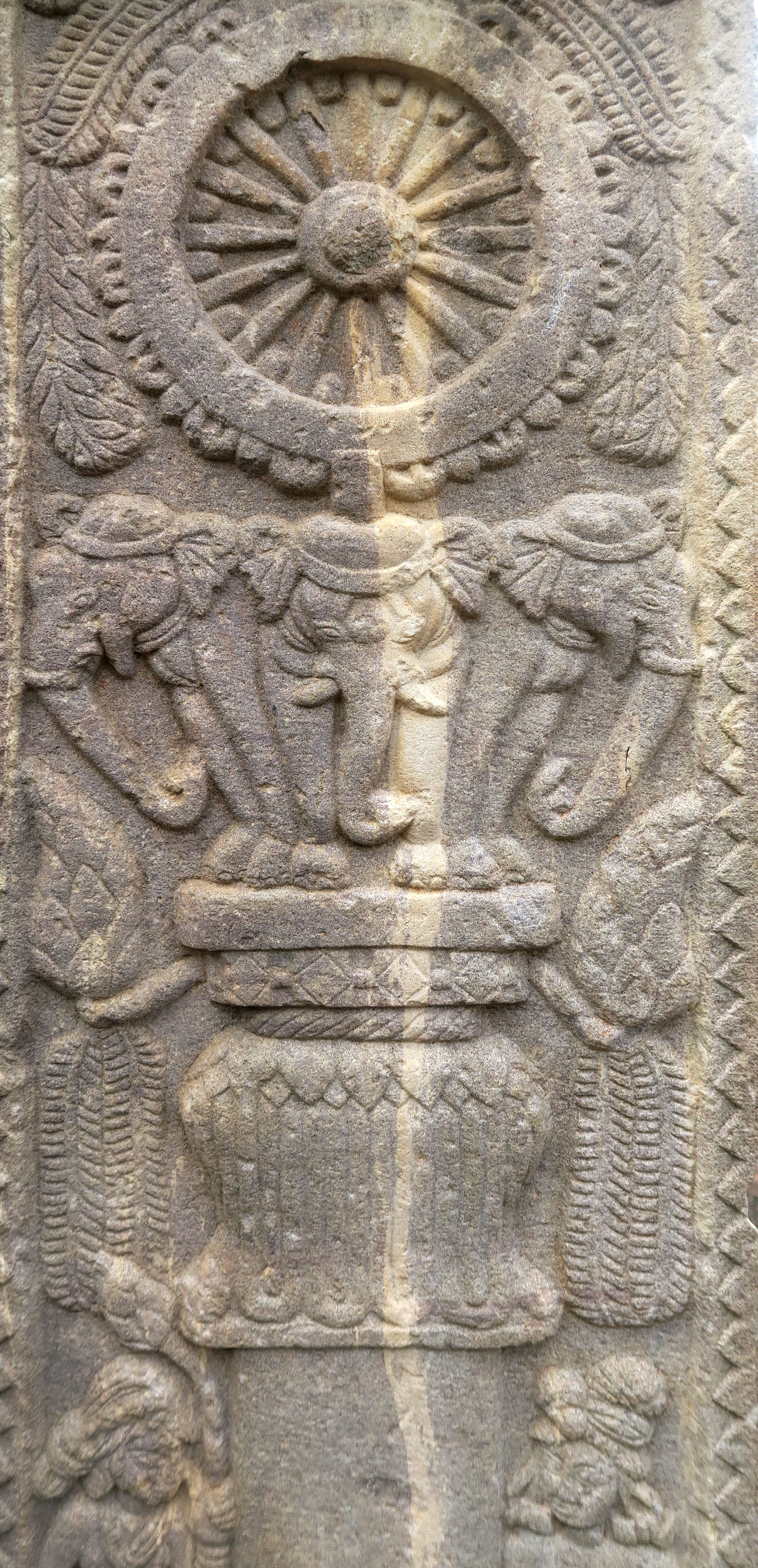
Pillar with elephants and Dharmachakra.

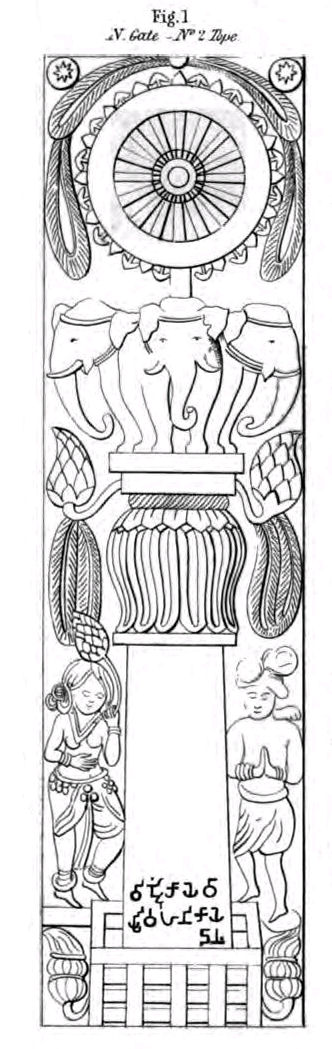
The full pillar.

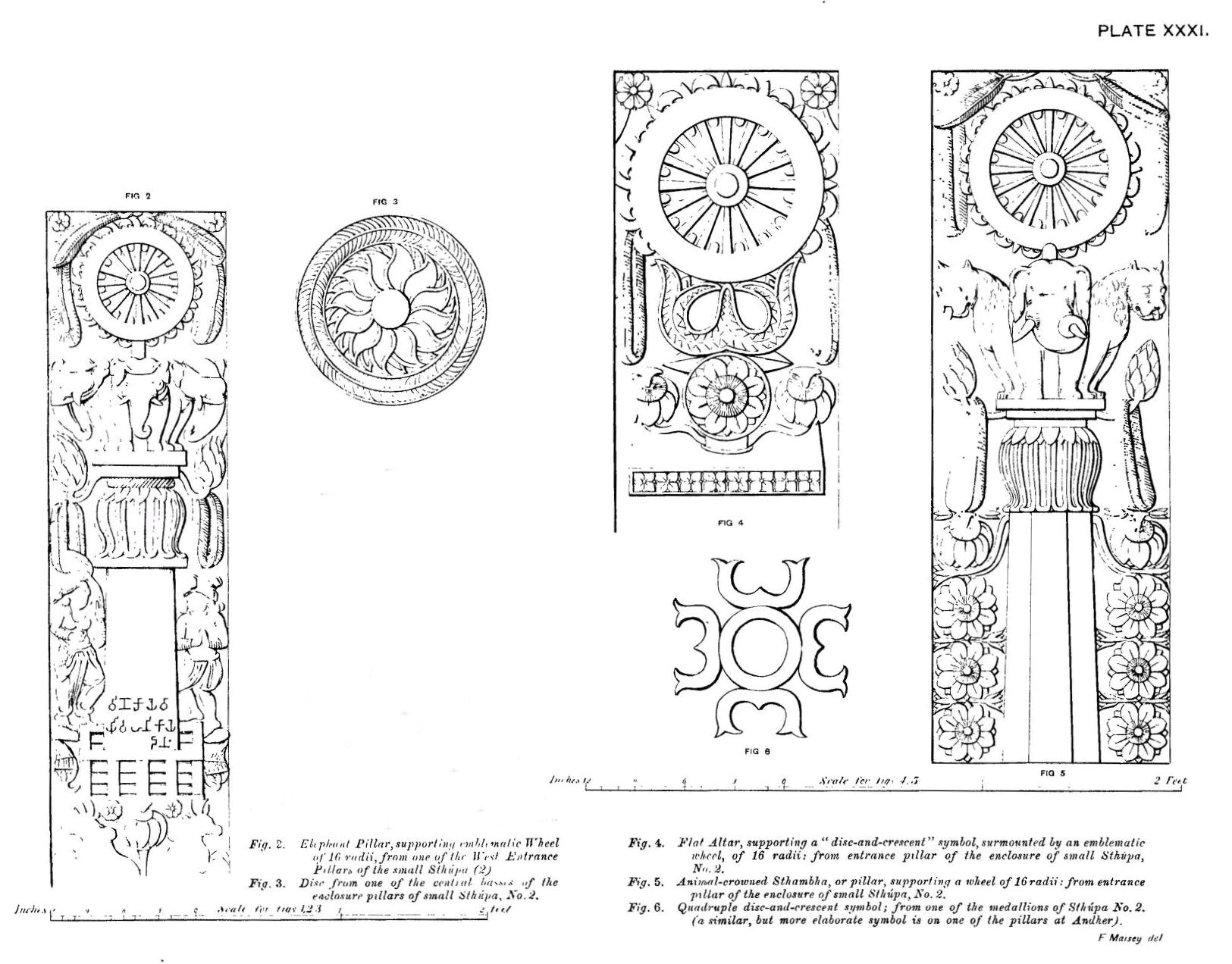
Various decorative elements of Stupa No.2, Sanchi.

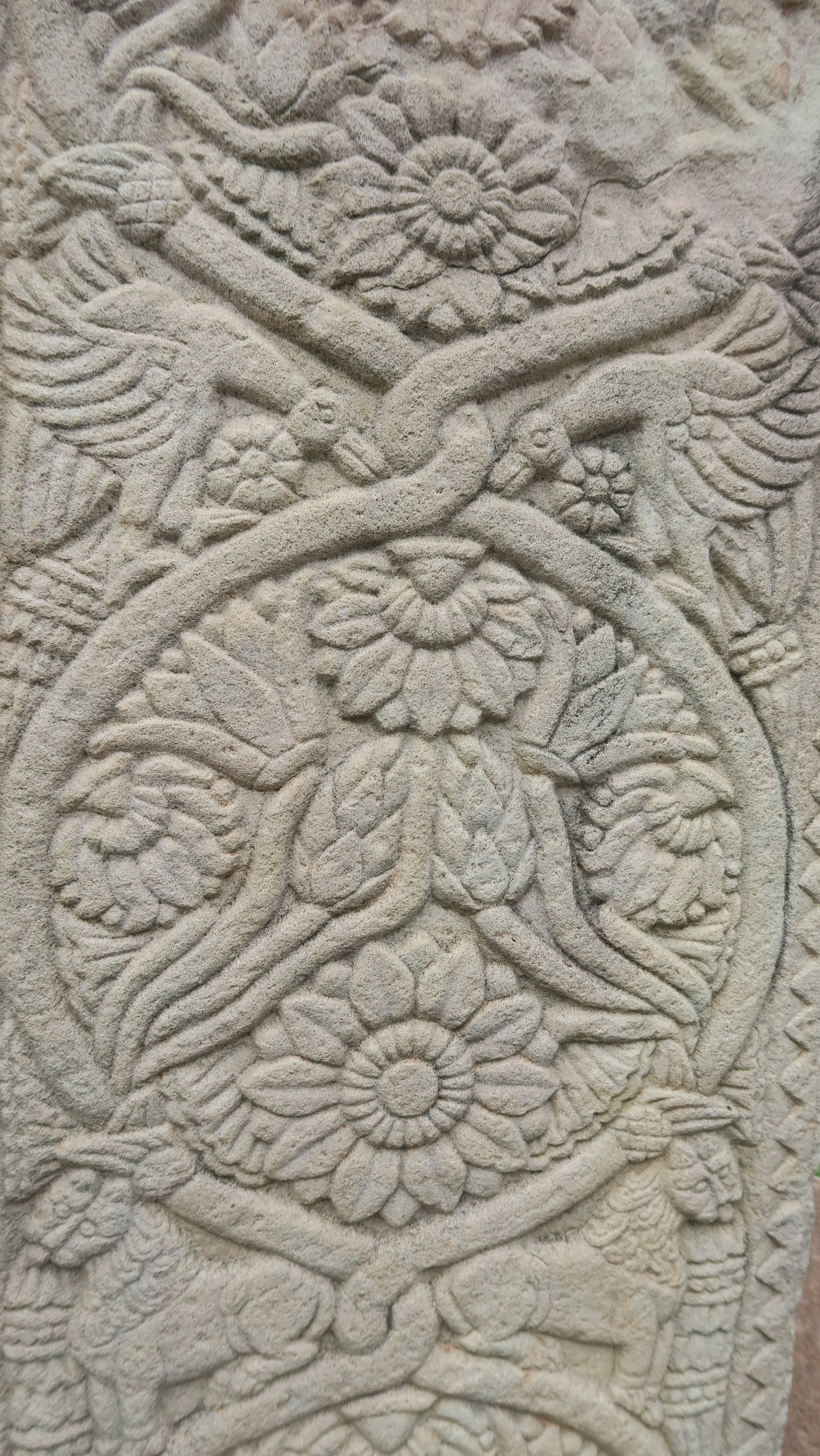
Floral designs.

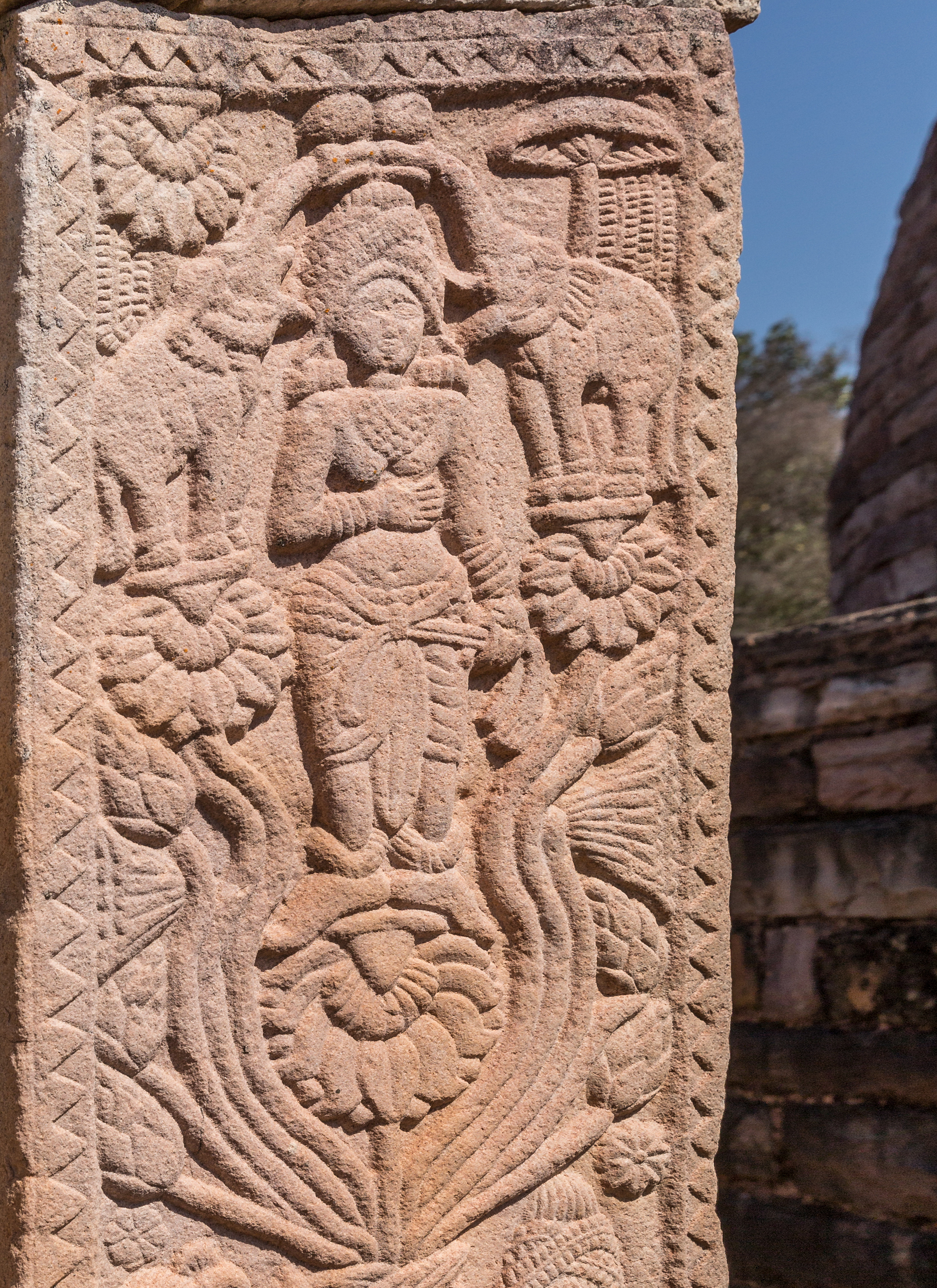
Lakshmi.

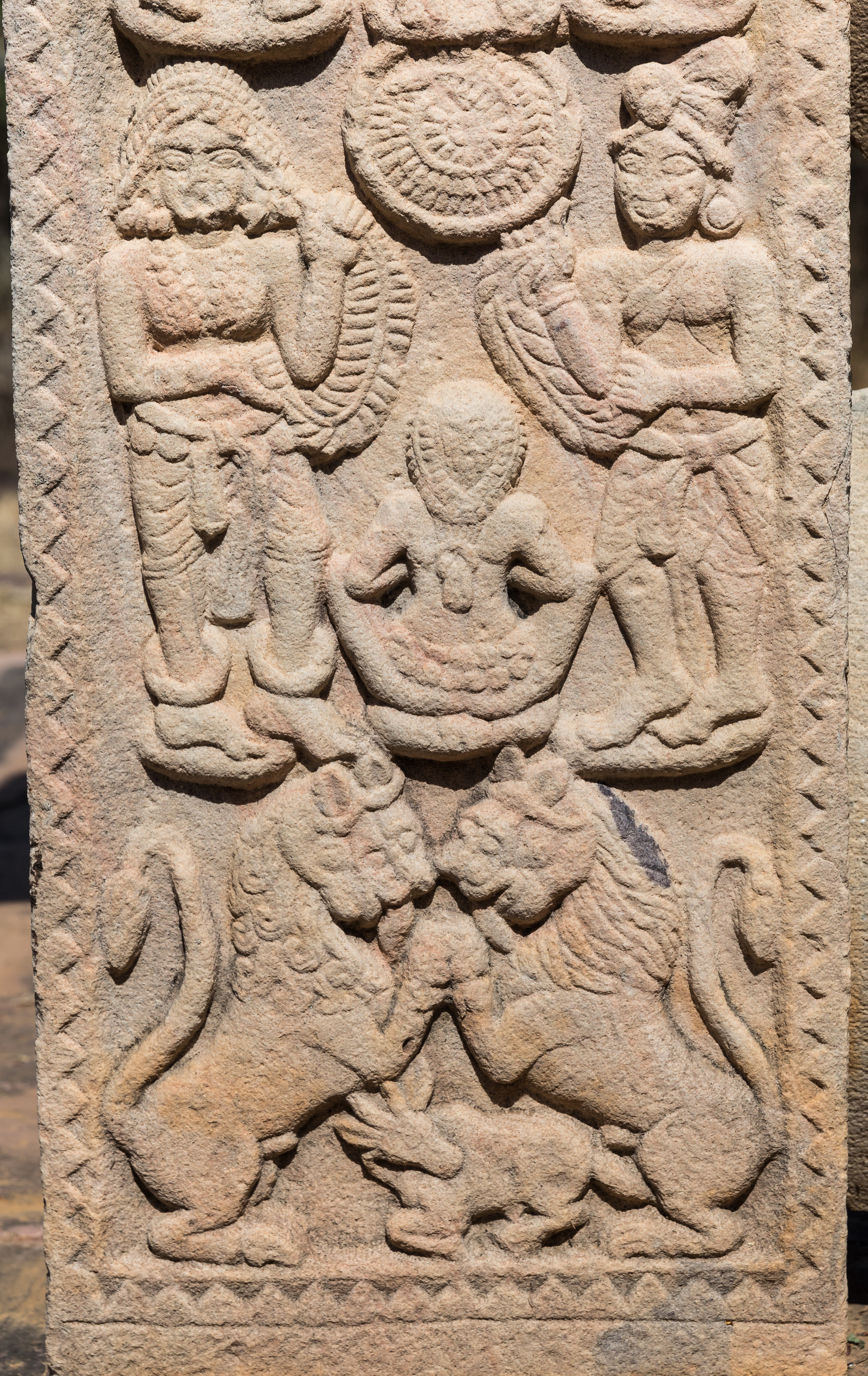
Devotional scene.

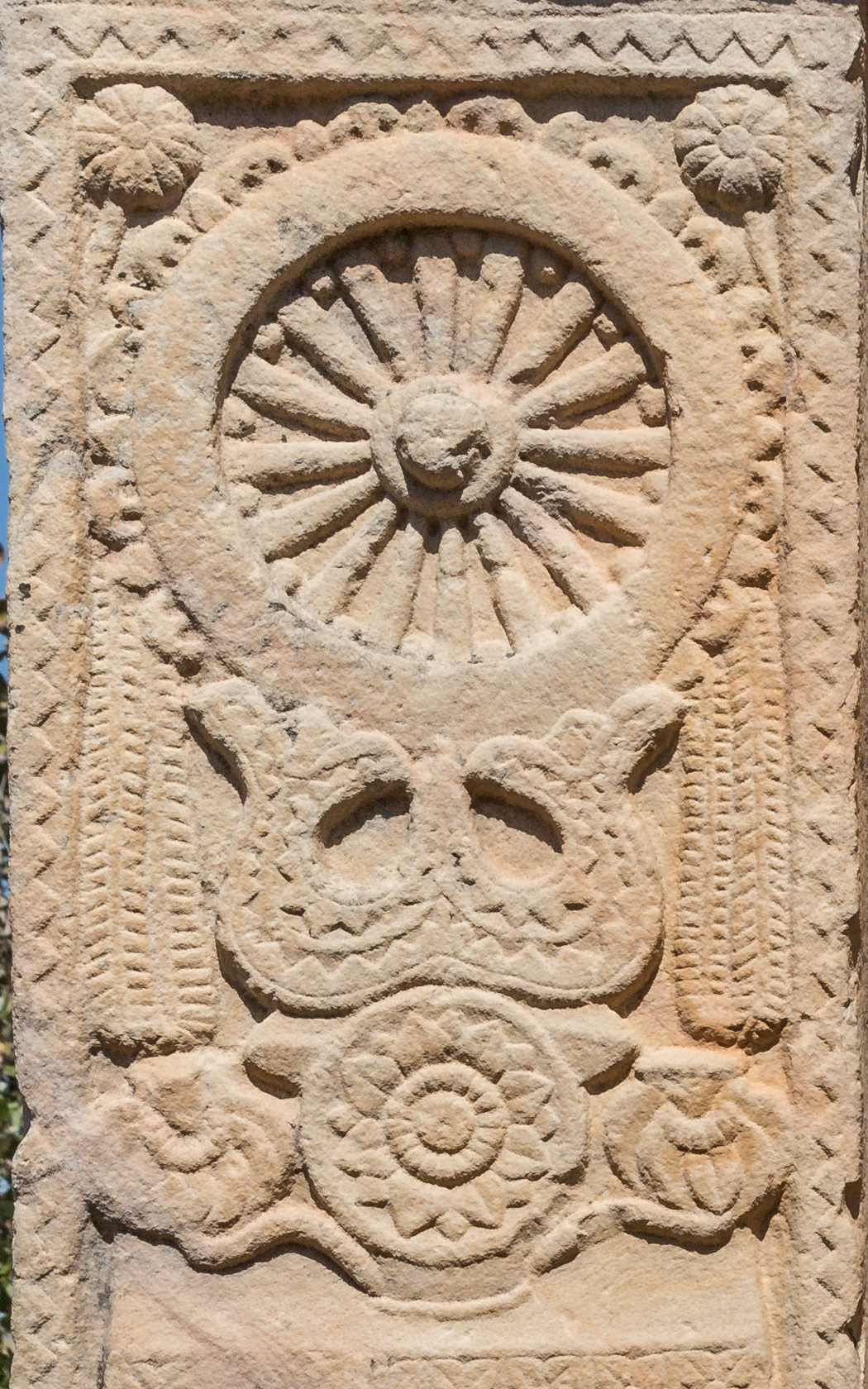
Dharmachakra and Triratna.

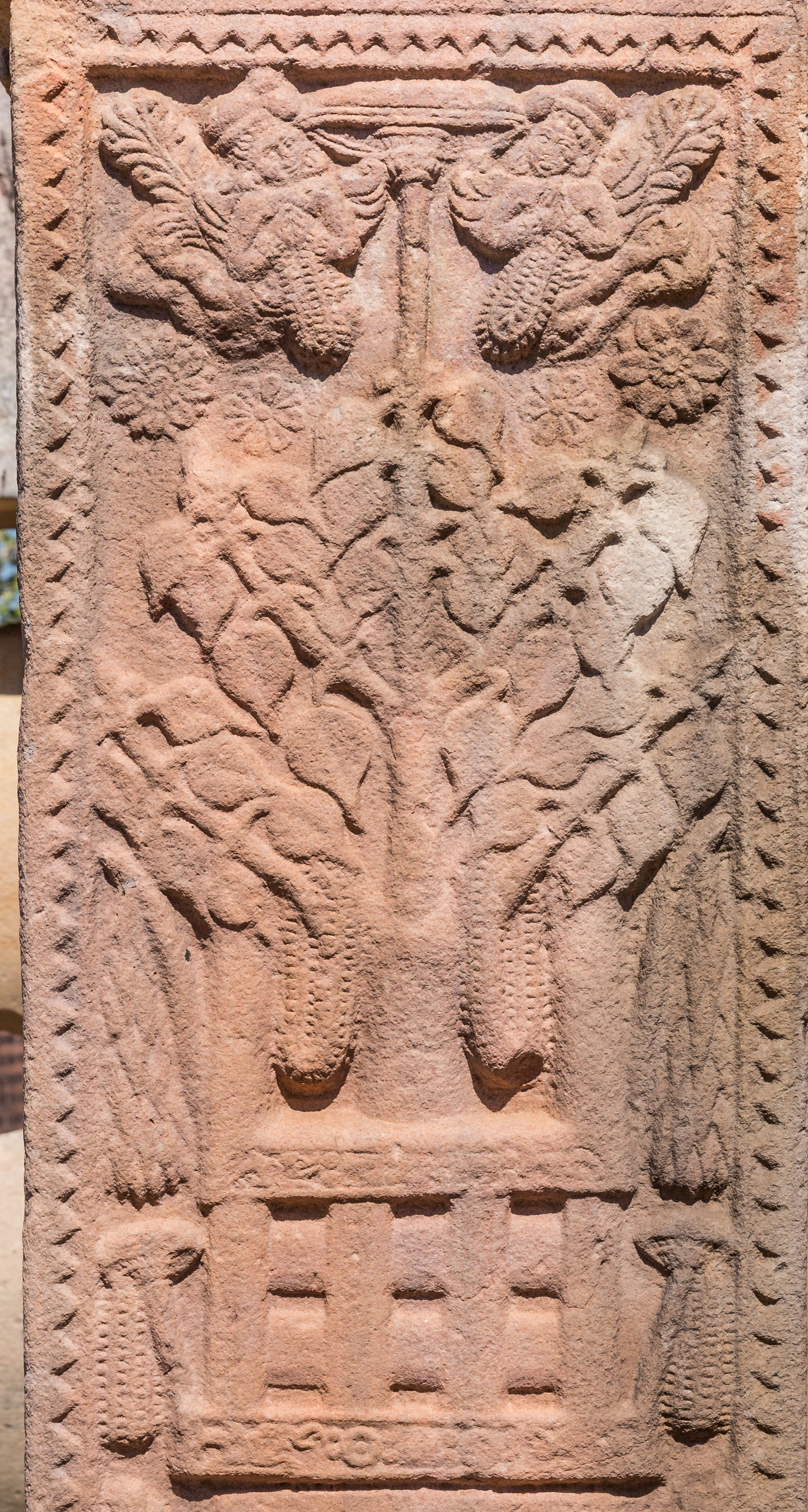
Bodhi tree.

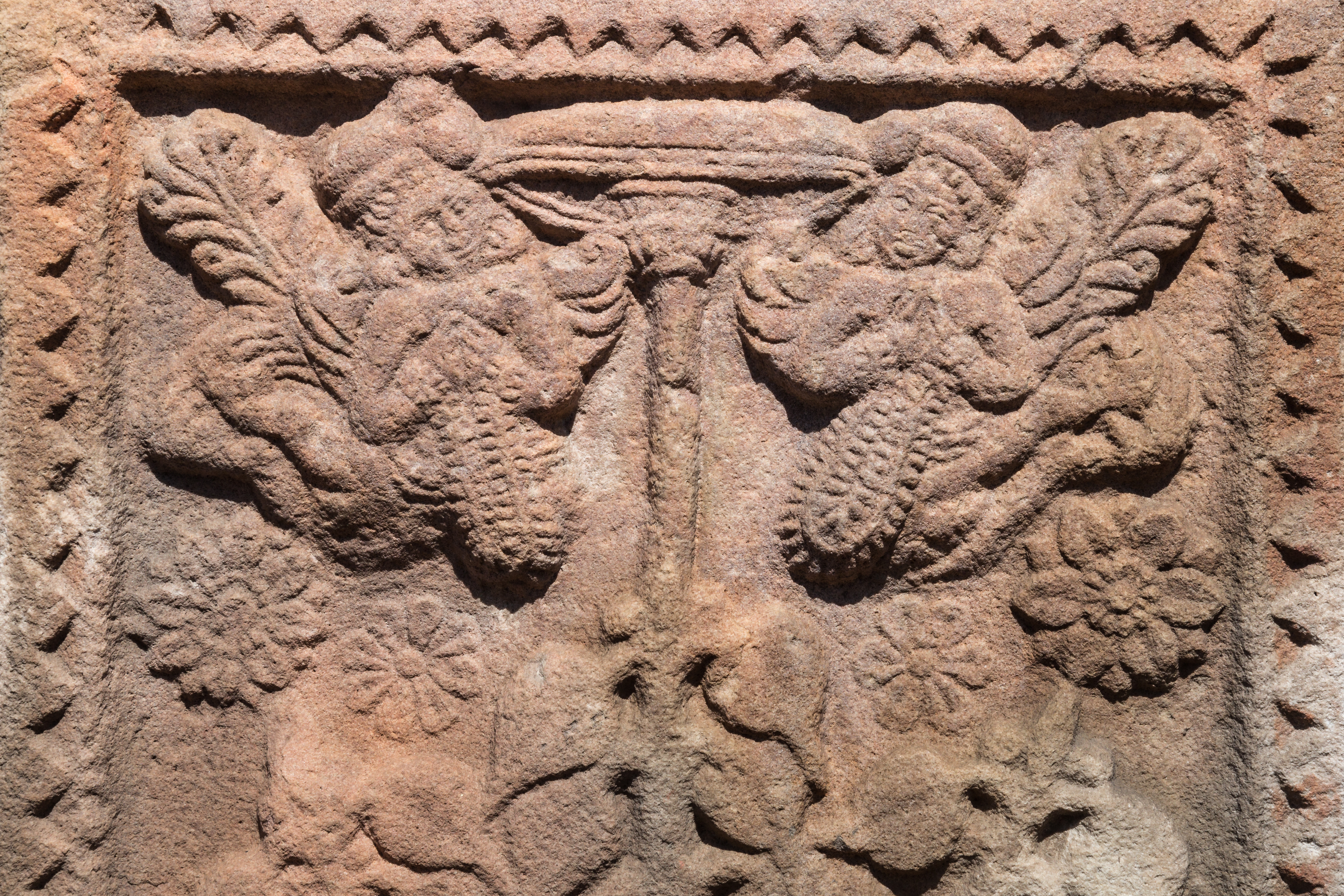
Apsaras.

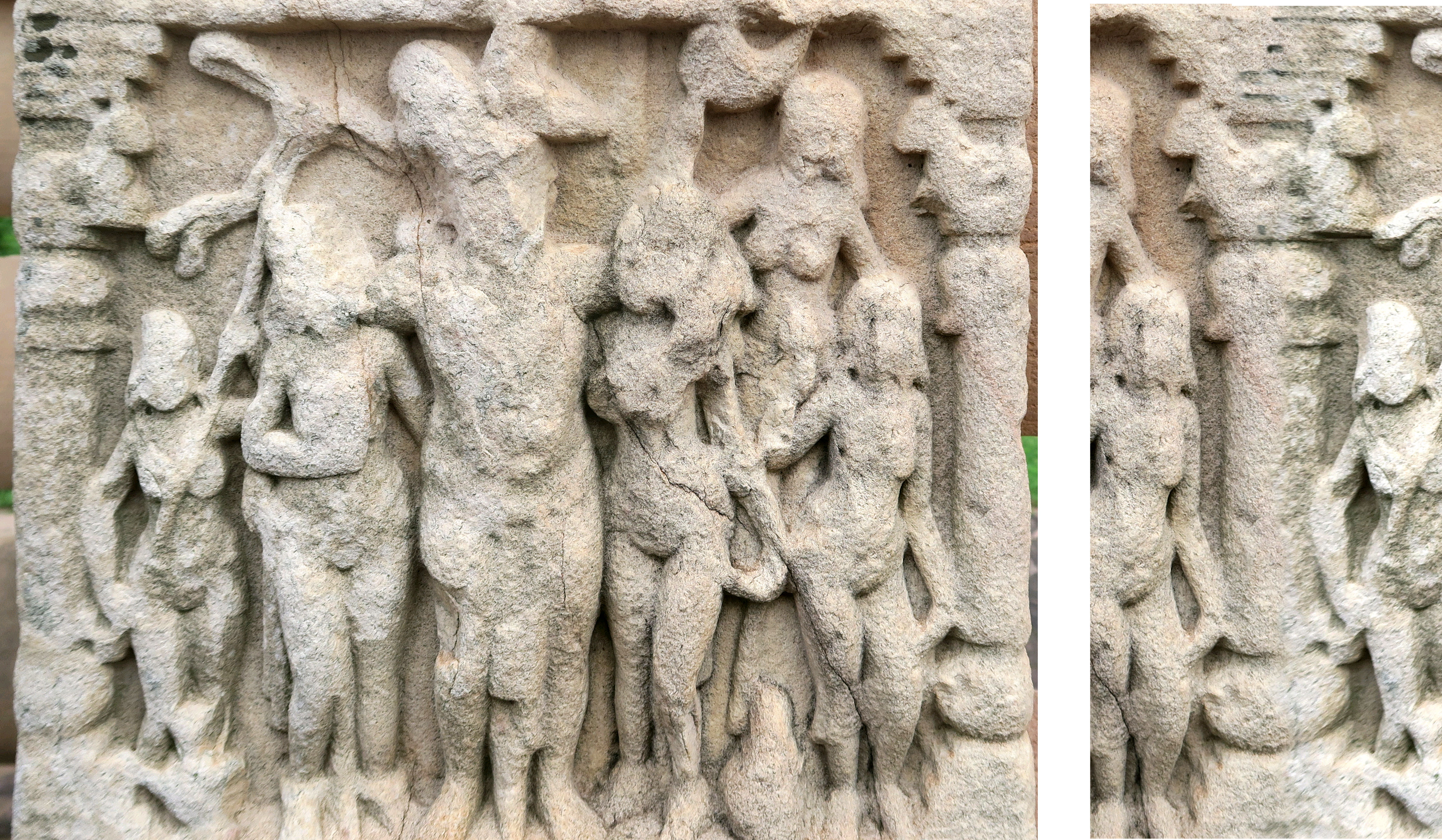
Ashoka supported by his two wives, with reconstituted pillar detail. Also seen in a contemporary relief on the Southern Gateway of Stupa 1.

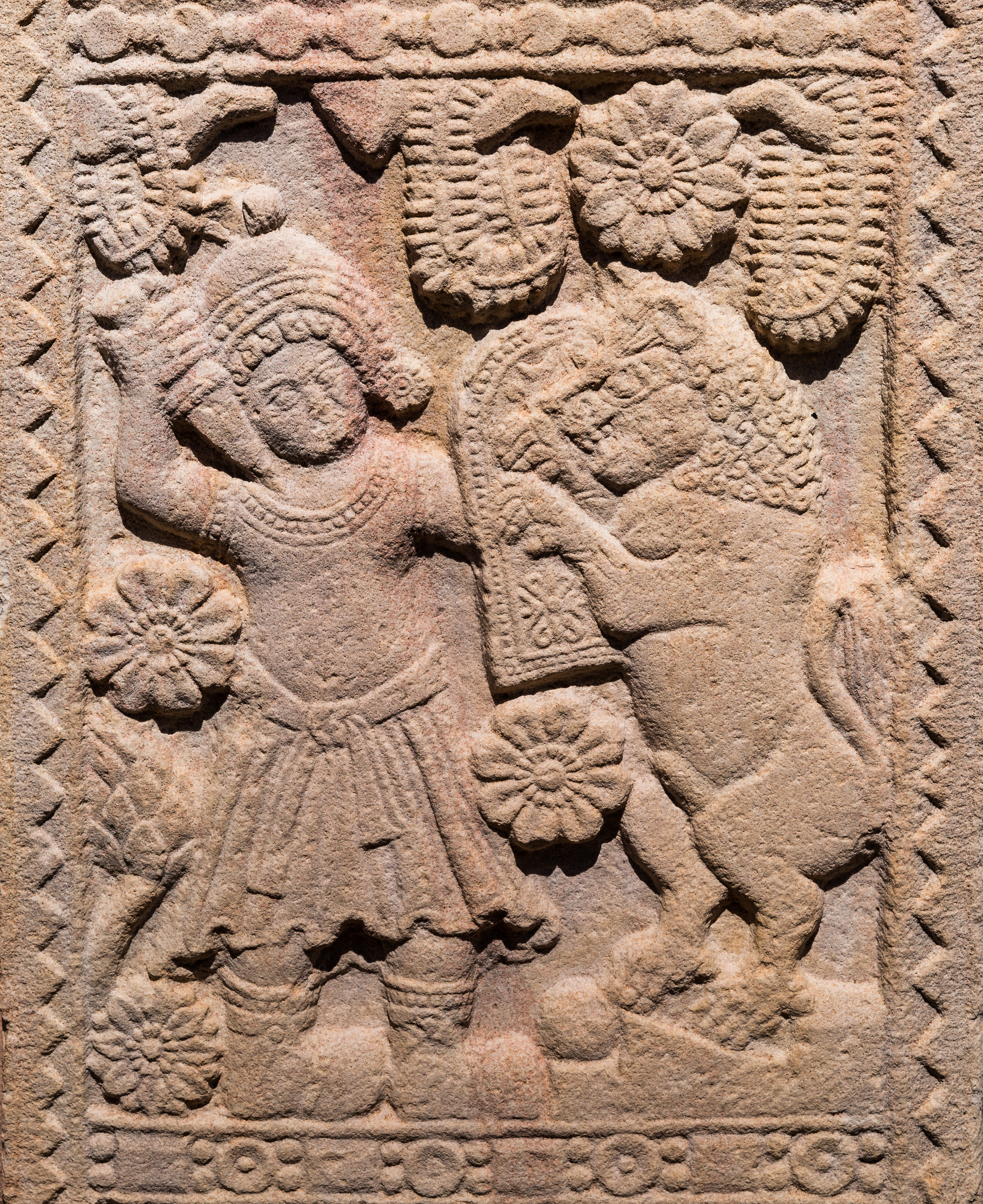
Man in costume from the northwest, fighting against lions.

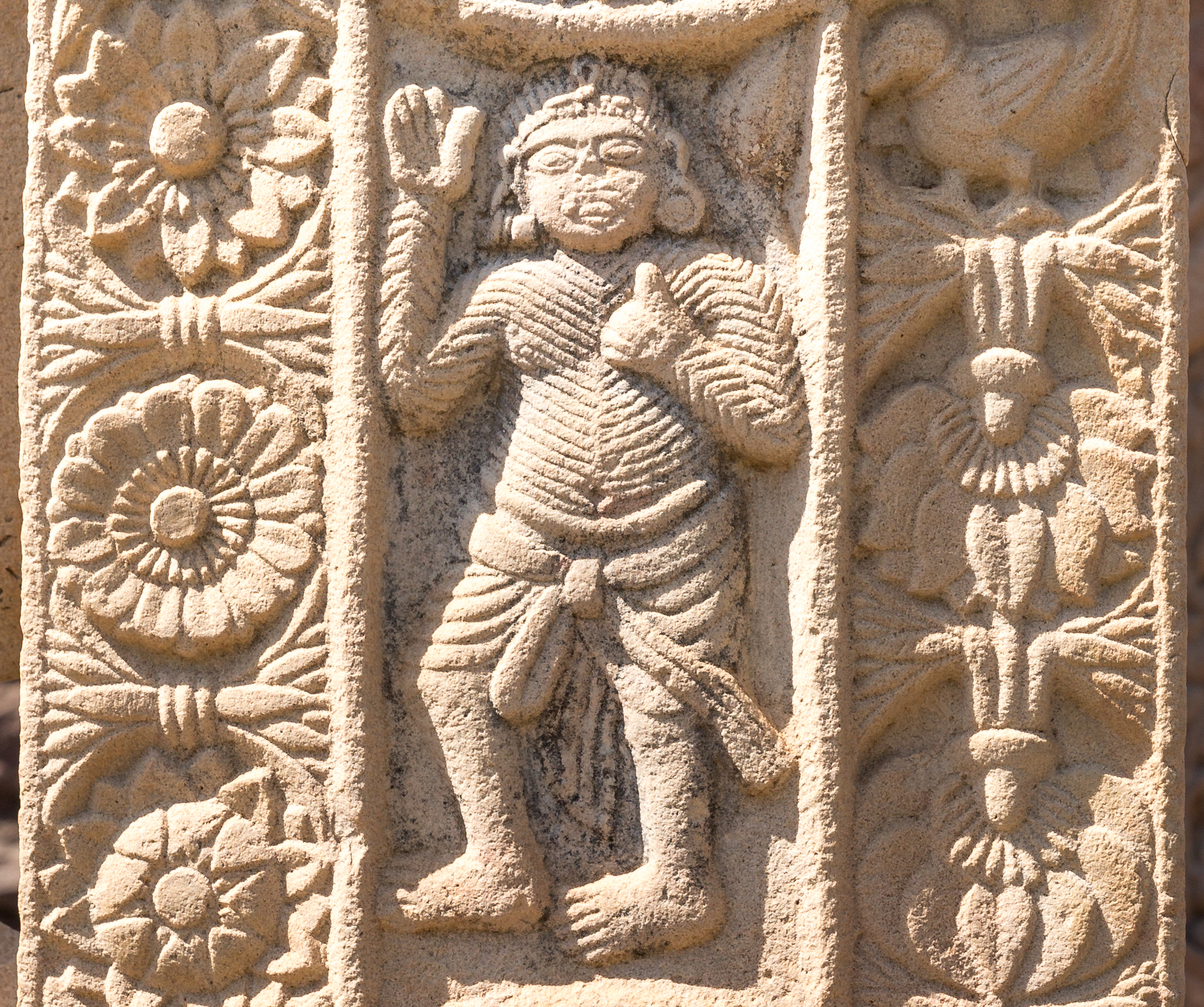
Man in costume from the northwest, possibly an Indo-Scythian.

=== Dedicatory inscriptions ===
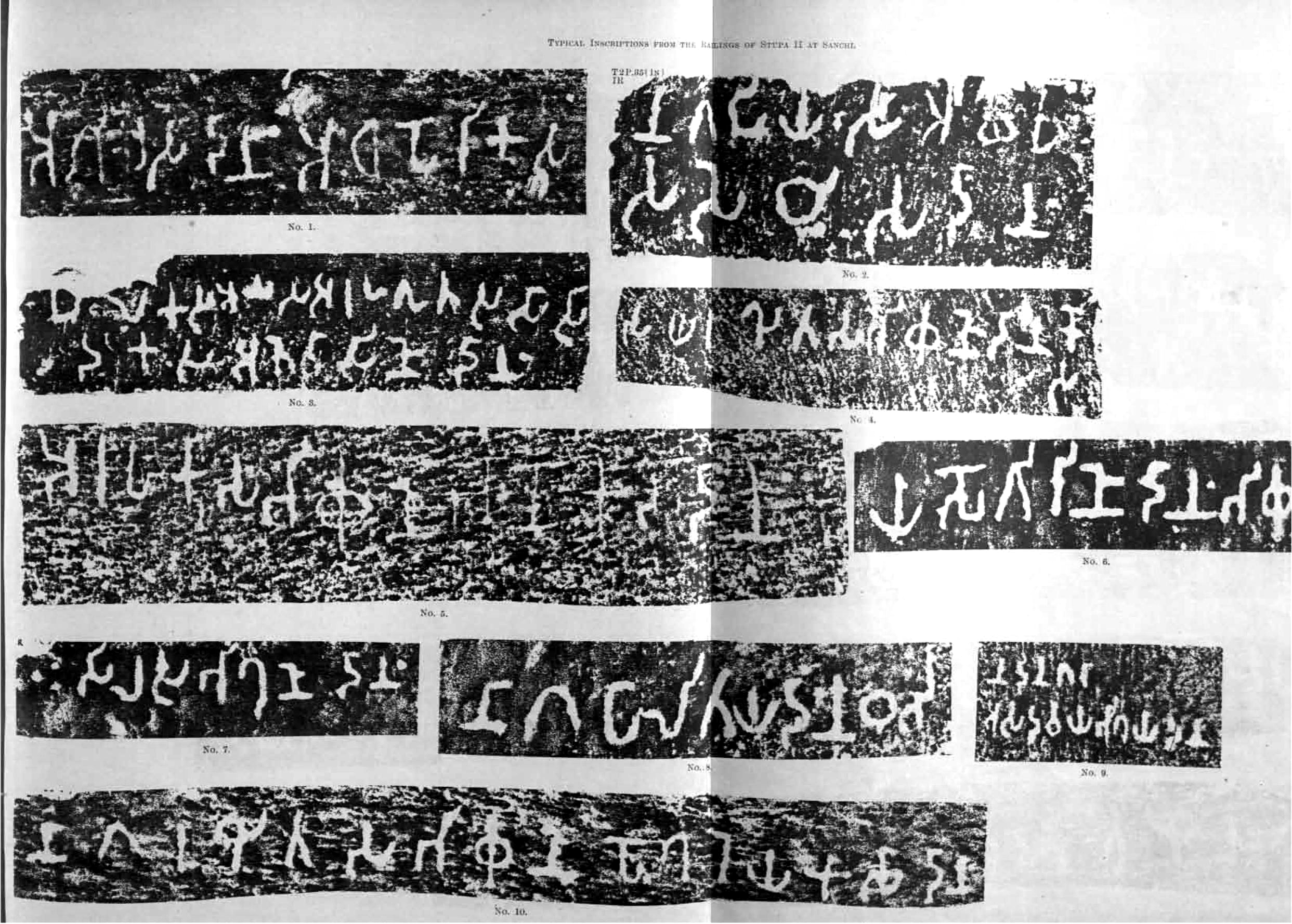
Inscriptions on the railings of Sanchi Stupa II

There are also numerous dedicatory inscriptions on the railings of Stupa II in the Brahmi script, in a style similar to the Bharhut Stupa. The similarity in paleography suggests that Sanchi Stupa No. 2 and Bharhut were roughly coeval. According to Julia Shaw (2013), the donative inscriptions associated with Sanchi's major phase of Buddhist construction provide evidence of collective patronage. Donations like this helped fund the architectural features such as the railings and paving slabs, with contributors coming from different parts of central India and beyond. Shaw also argues that these inscriptions mainly document contributions toward monument construction, rather than the regular, everyday maintenance of Buddhist Monasteries.
