= Sarnath capital =

Sarnath capital (3rd-1st century BCE)
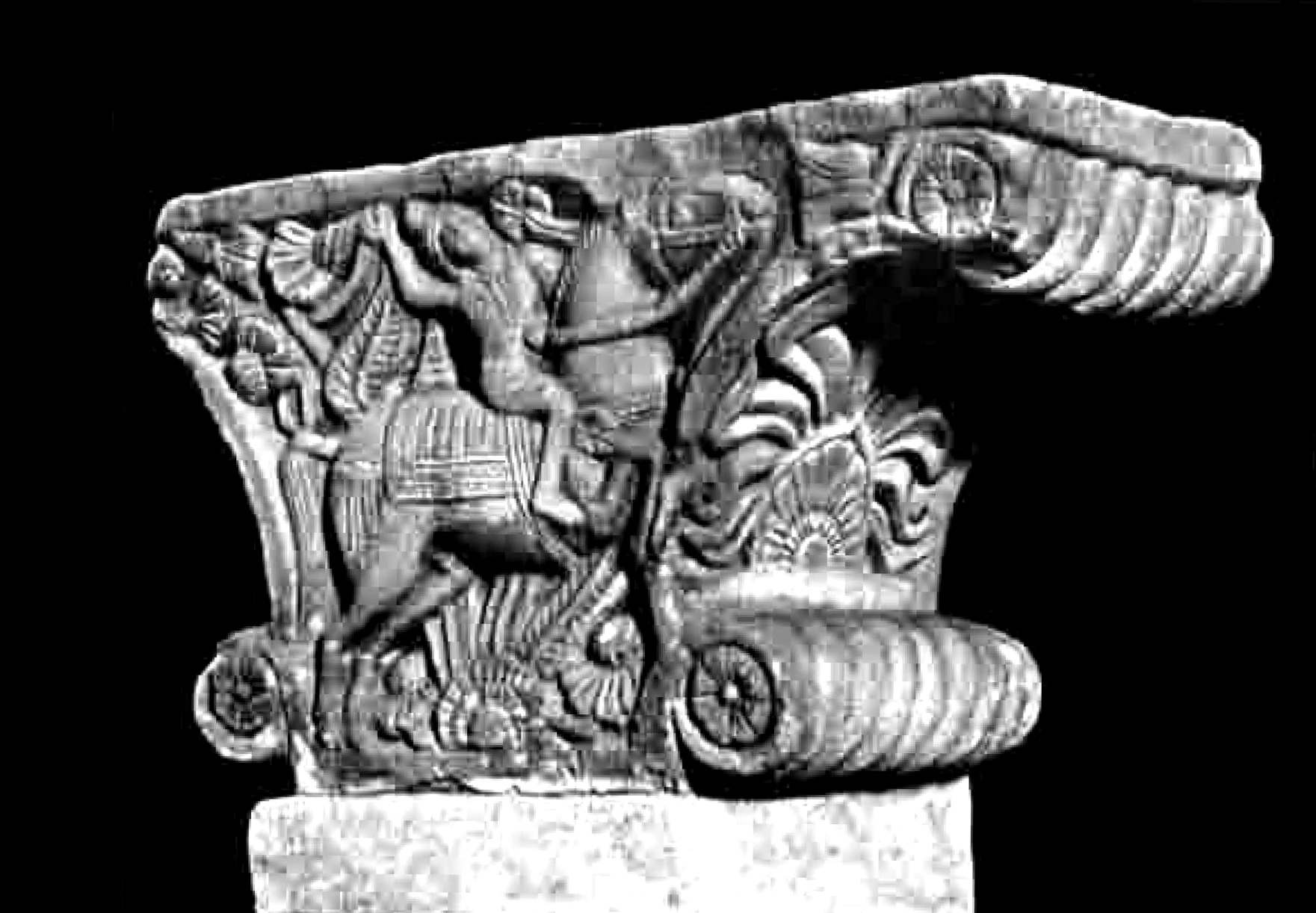
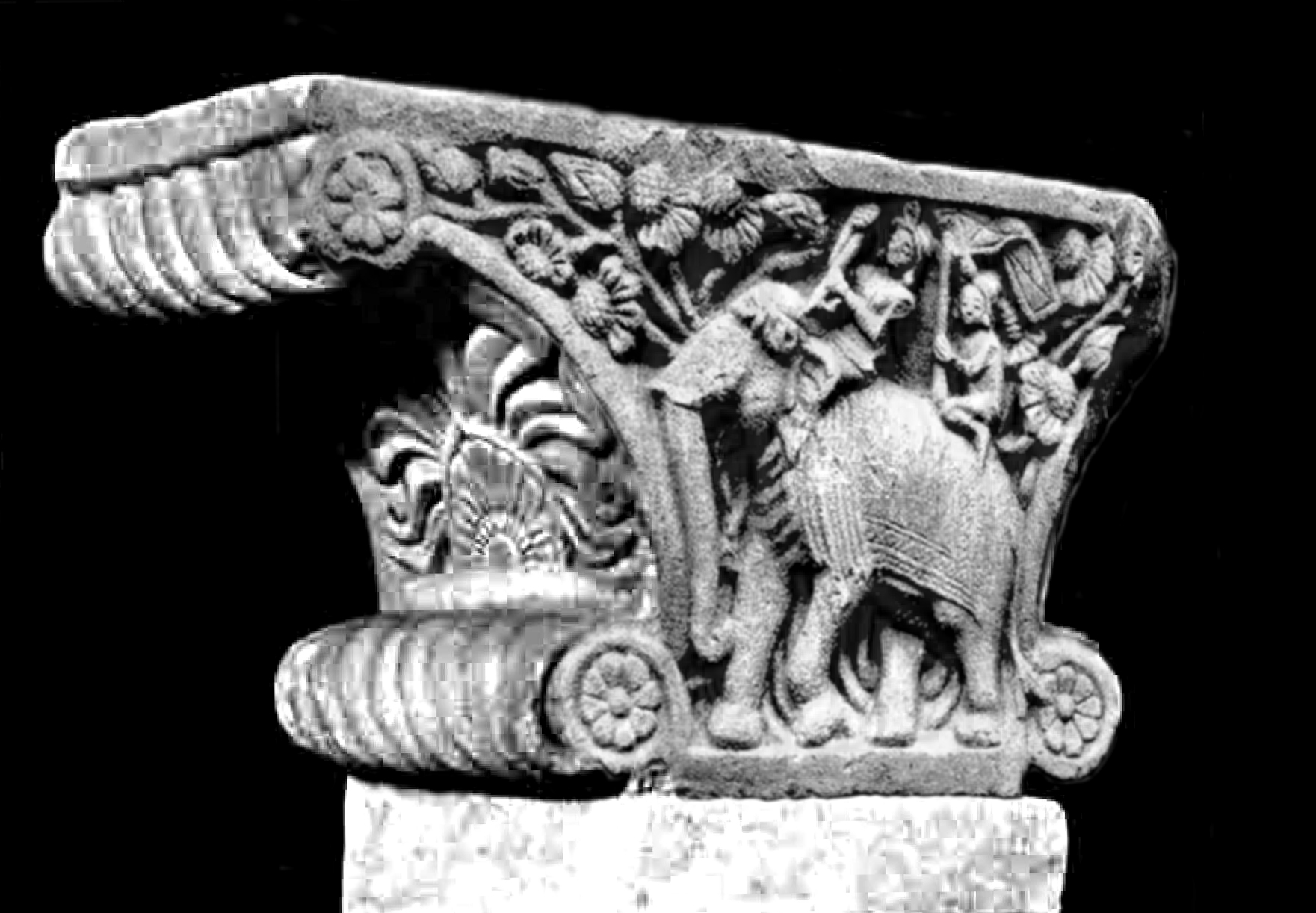
- The Sarnath capital front (actual view) and back (reconstructed from available photographs).
- Material: Stone
- Created: 3rd-1st century BCE
- Present location: Sarnath Museum, India

The Sarnath capital is a pillar capital, sometimes also described as a "stone bracket", discovered in the archaeological excavations at the ancient Buddhist site of Sarnath in 1905. The pillar displays Ionic volutes and palmettes. It used to be dated to the 3rd century BCE, during the Mauryan Empire period, but is now dated to the 1st century BCE, during the Sunga Empire period.

One of the faces shows a galloping horse carrying a rider, while the other face shows an elephant and its mahaut.

The capital is suggestive of the Hellenistic Ionic order, and is often discussed in conjunction with the Pataliputra capital. The two capitals have also been described as "quasi-Ionic", and compared for example to the anta capitals of the Temple of Apollo in Didyma.

The capital is now located in the Sarnath Museum.

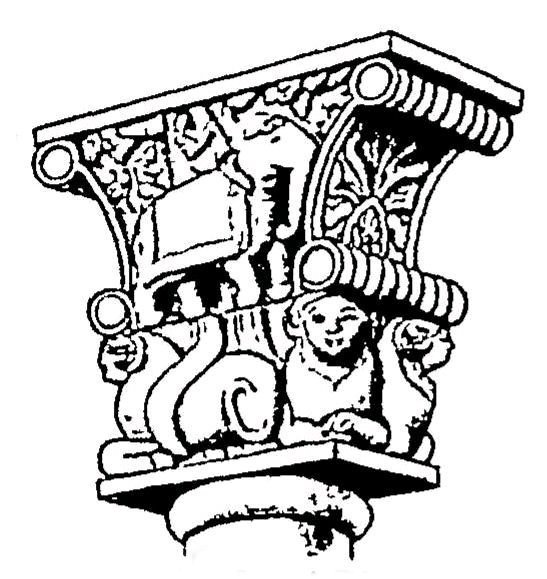
Reconstruction of the full capital by Percy Brown

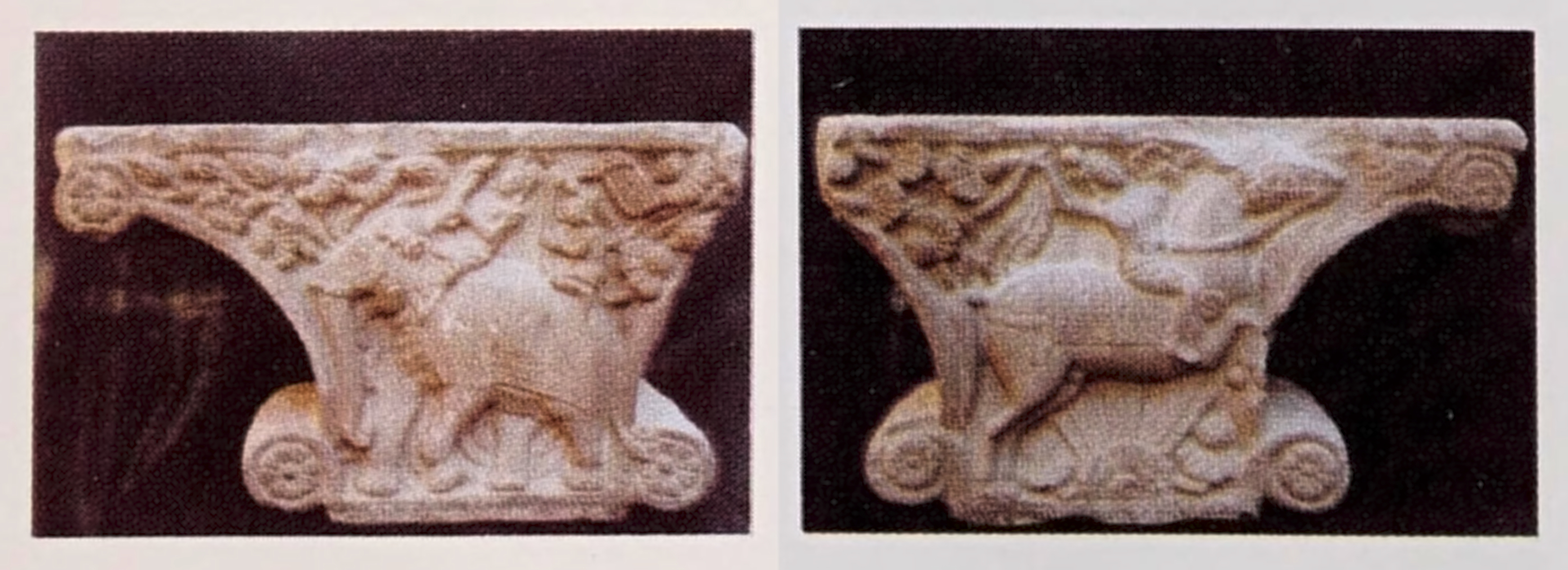
Frontal views of the Sarnath capital, in the Sarnath Museum

== See also ==
- Hellenistic influence on Indian art
