= Bulandi =

Bulandi may refer to:

- Bulundi (or Bulandi), a 1981 Indian Hindi-language action film by Esmayeel Shroff, starring Raj Kumar, Kim, Danny Denzongpa and Asha Parekh
- Bulandi (1990 film), a Pakistani Urdu film
- Bulandi (2000 film), an Indian Hindi-language film by Rama Rao Tatineni, starring Anil Kapoor, Rekha and Rajinikanth
- Krantiveera Sangolli Rayanna (2012 film), released as Bulandi in Hindi, an Indian Kannada-language historical- war film by Naganna, starring Darshan, Jaya Prada and Nikita Thukral
- Bulandi Bagh, an archaeological site in Patna, India

== See also ==
- Bulandshahr, city in Uttar Pradesh, India
  - Bulandshahr (Assembly constituency)
  - Bulandshahr (Lok Sabha constituency)
