= Bulandi Bagh =

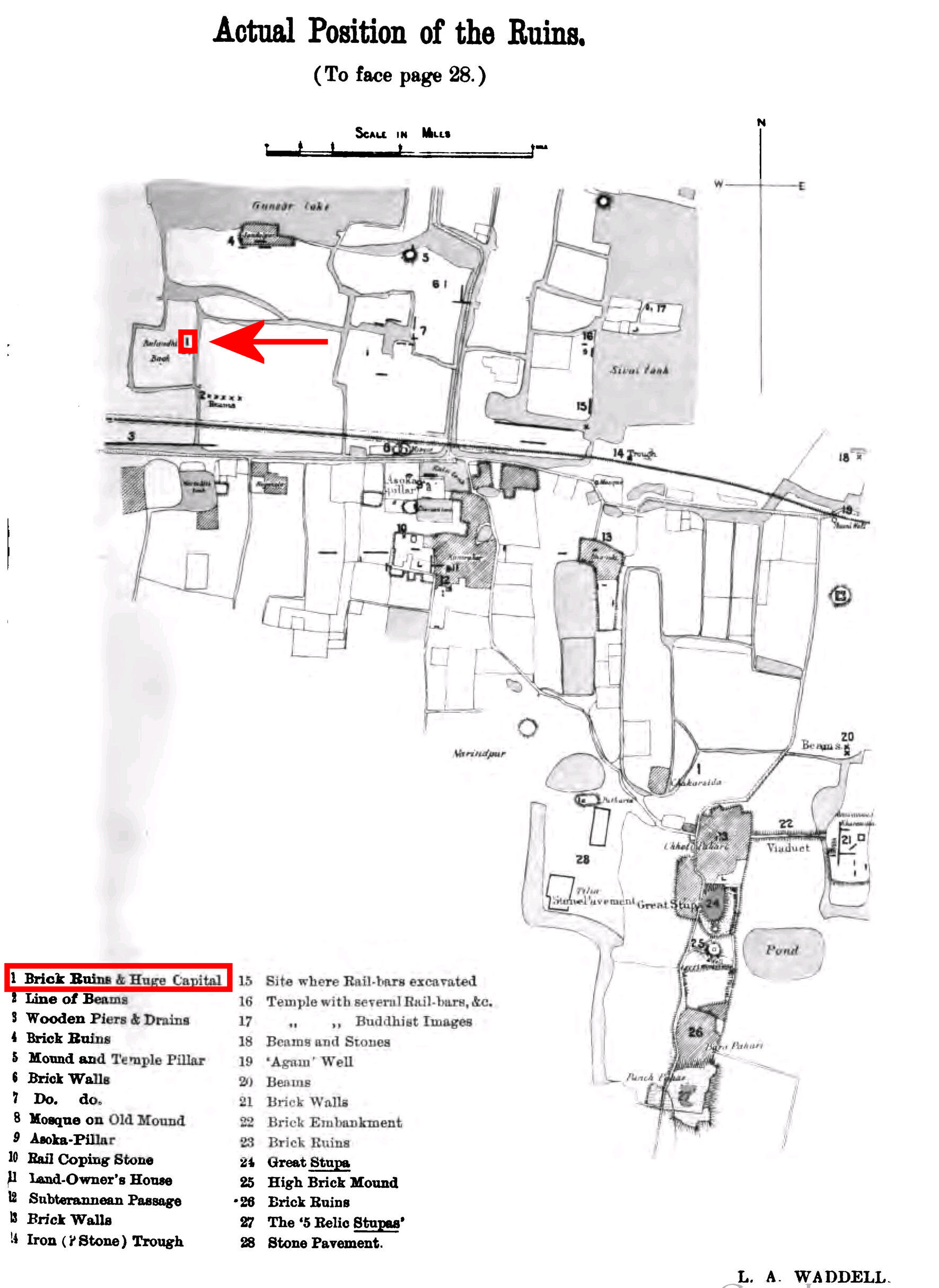
- Bulandi Bagh is located in the northwestern corner, just above the railroad, of the 1895 excavation plan at Pataliputra (marked "Bulandhi Bagh" and "I").

- Location within India Location within Bihar
- 25°36′07″N 85°10′48″E
- Type: Settlement
- Location: Patna district, Bihar, India

Bulandi Bagh is an area within the archaeological site of Pataliputra, located north of the railway station in the modern city of Patna. It is mainly known for the discovery of the monumental Pataliputra capital, which was unearthed in 1895 by L.A. Waddell. Additionally, excavations at Bulandi Bagh revealed wooden palisades believed to have constituted the protective walls of ancient Pataliputra. It is widely speculated that Bulandi Bagh was once a part of the royal palace complex of the Maurya dynasty in Pataliputra.

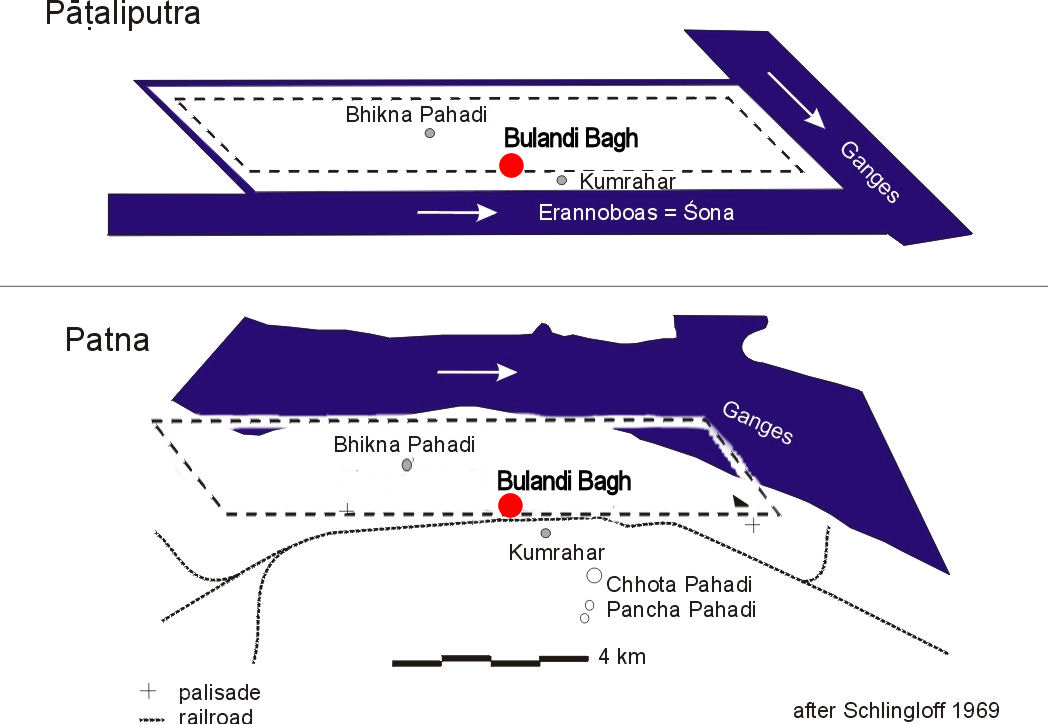
Location of Bulandi Bagh in the ancient city of Pataliputra and modern Patna (Pataliputra city limits in dotted line).

Additional excavations were conducted in the area of Bulandi Bagh between 1912 and 1913 by American archaeologist David Brainard Spooner, who was working for the British Archaeological Survey of India. While Spooner primarily focused his efforts on the Kumrahar site to the south, he also made significant discoveries in Bulandi Bagh. These included the unearthing of a wooden palisade punch-marked coins, and terracotta figures such as the head of a smiling boy and a dancing figure, as well as a variety of beads and seals.

In 1926–1927, J.A. Page and M. Ghosh for the Archaeological Survey of India excavated the area again leading to the discovery of large wooden palisades (137 meters were excavated), also thought to be of the Mauryan period. It is thought that it is the palissade seen by Megasthenes during his visit to Pataliputra. Strabo in his Geographia, quoting Megasthenes:

"At the confluence of the Ganges and of another river is situated Palibothra, in length 80, and in breadth 15 stadia. It is in the shape of a parallelogram, surrounded by a wooden wall pierced with openings through which arrows may be discharged. In front is a ditch, which serves the purpose of defence and of a sewer for the city." Strabo, "Geographia"

According to Arrian, also quoting Megasthenes:

"Megasthenes says that on one side where it is longest this city extends ten miles in length, and that its breadth is one and threequarters miles; that the city has been surrounded with a ditch in breadth 600 feet, and in depth 45 feet; and that its wall has 570 towers and 64 gates." Arrian, "The Indica"

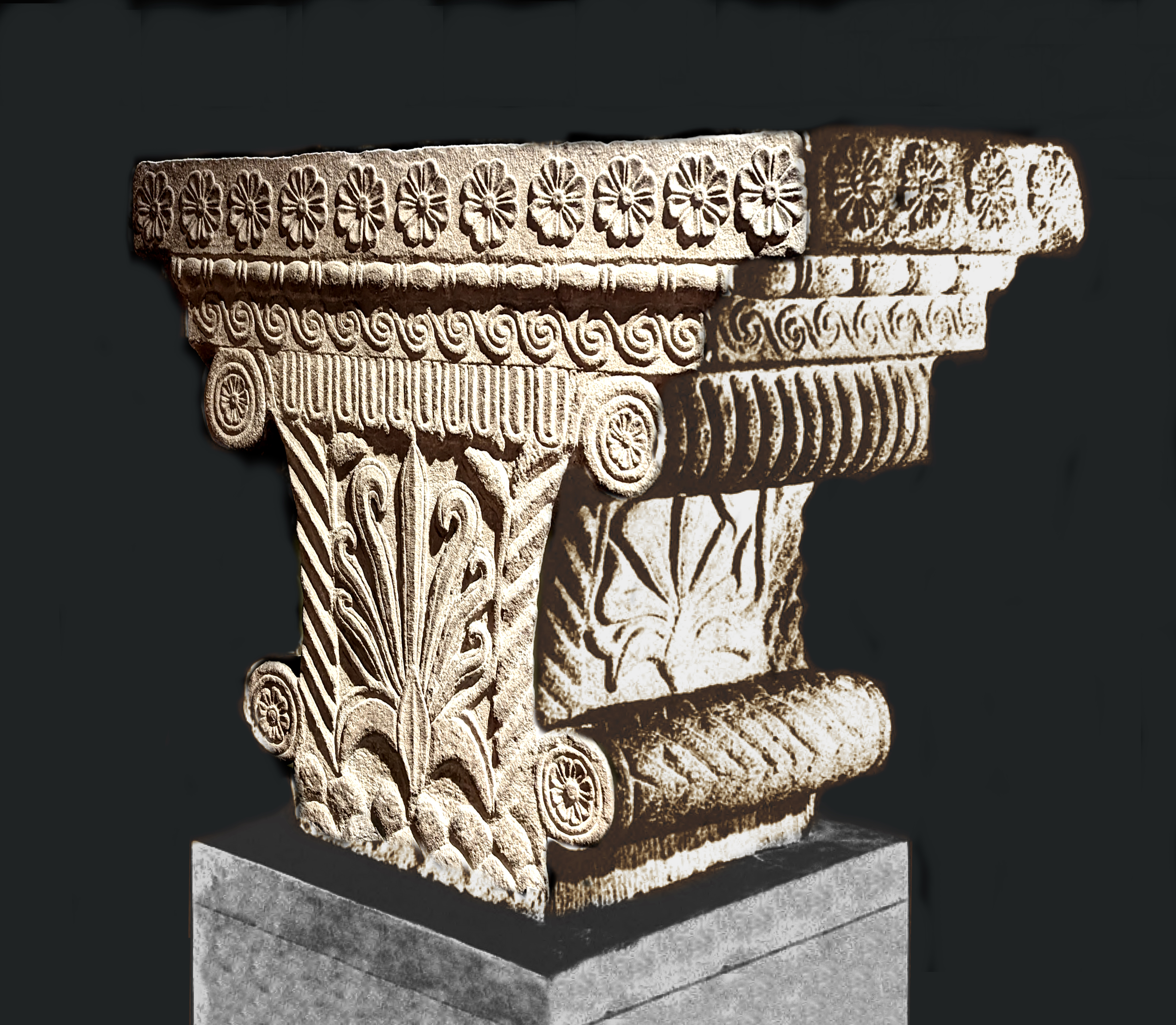
The Pataliputra capital was excavated in Bulandi Bagh.

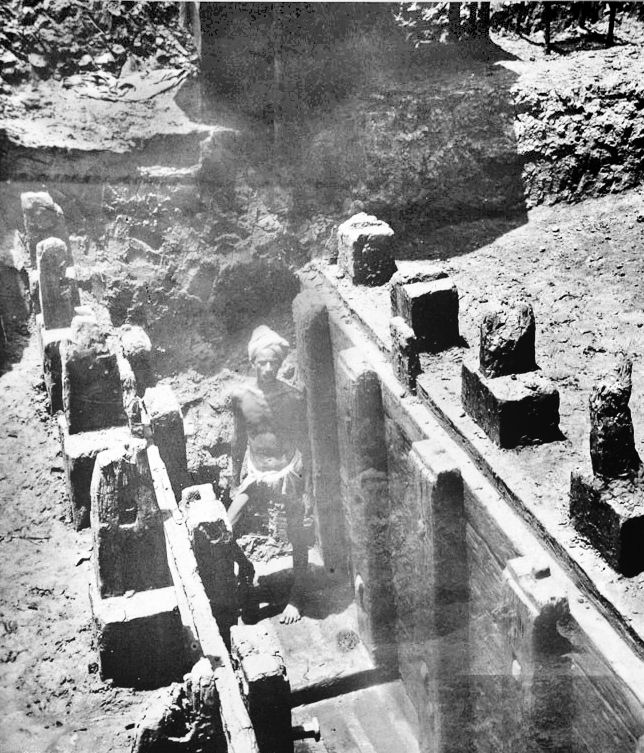
Mauryan remains of wooden palissade at the Bulandi Bagh site, 1912–13.

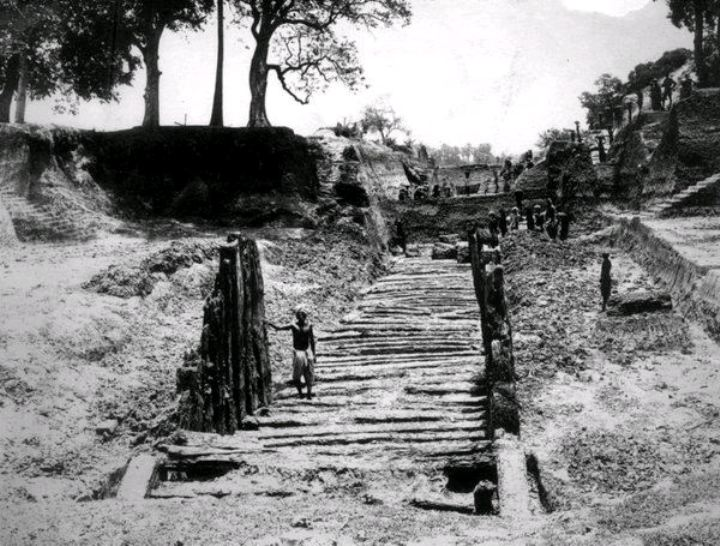
Mauryan remains of a wooden palissade at Bulandi Bagh site, 1926–27.

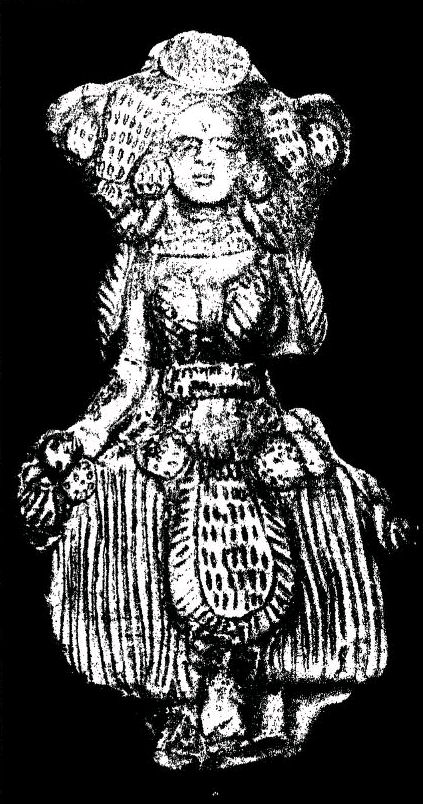
Female figure found at Bulandi Bagh, Sunga period.
