= Anta capital =

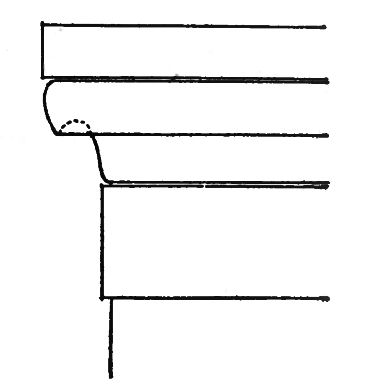
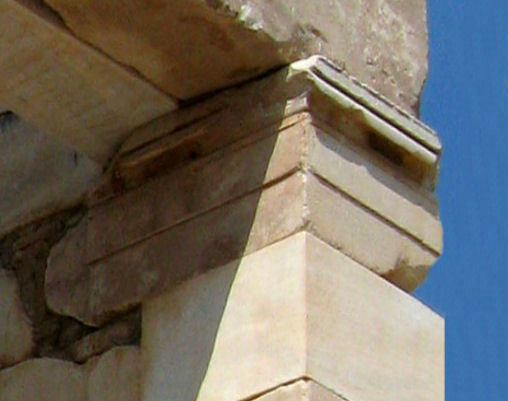
Left image: Characteristic shape of the Doric anta capital.
Right image: Doric anta capital at the Athenian Treasury (circa 500 BCE).

An anta capital is the crowning portion of an anta, the front edge of a supporting wall in Greek temple architecture. The anta is generally crowned by a stone block designed to spread the load from the superstructure (entablature) it supports, called an "anta capital" when it is structural, or sometimes "pilaster capital" if it is only decorative as often during the Roman period.

In order not to protrude unduly from the wall, these anta capitals usually display a rather flat surface, so that the capital has more or less a brick-shaped structure overall. The anta capital can be more or less decorated depending on the artistic order it belongs to, with designs, at least in ancient Greek architecture, often quite different from the design of the column capitals it stands next to. This difference disappeared with Roman times, when anta or pilaster capitals have designs very similar to those of the column capitals.

== Doric anta capital ==
The Doric capital was designed in the continuity of the wall cornice. It is characterized by a broad neck, a beak molding and an abacus. The decoration is usually very sparse, except for the capitals displaying a transition with the Ionic order.

== Ionic anta capital ==
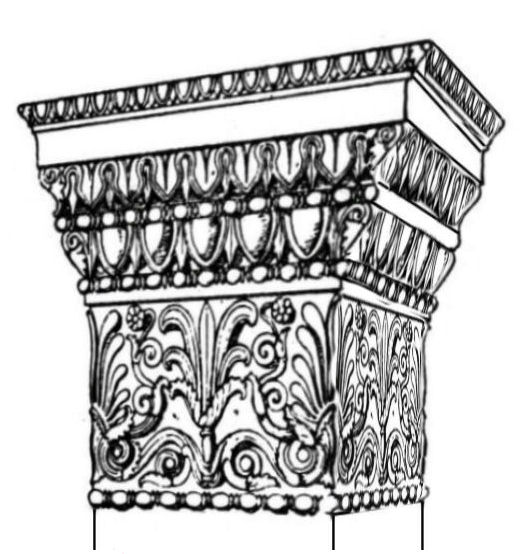
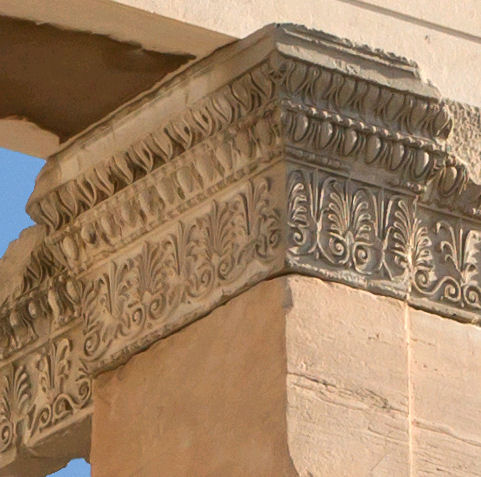
Left image: Characteristic design of the Ionic anta capital (essentially flat with straight horizontal moldings).
Right image: A characteristically rectangular Ionic anta capital, with extensive bands of floral patterns in prolongation of adjoining friezes at the Erechtheion (circa 410 BCE).

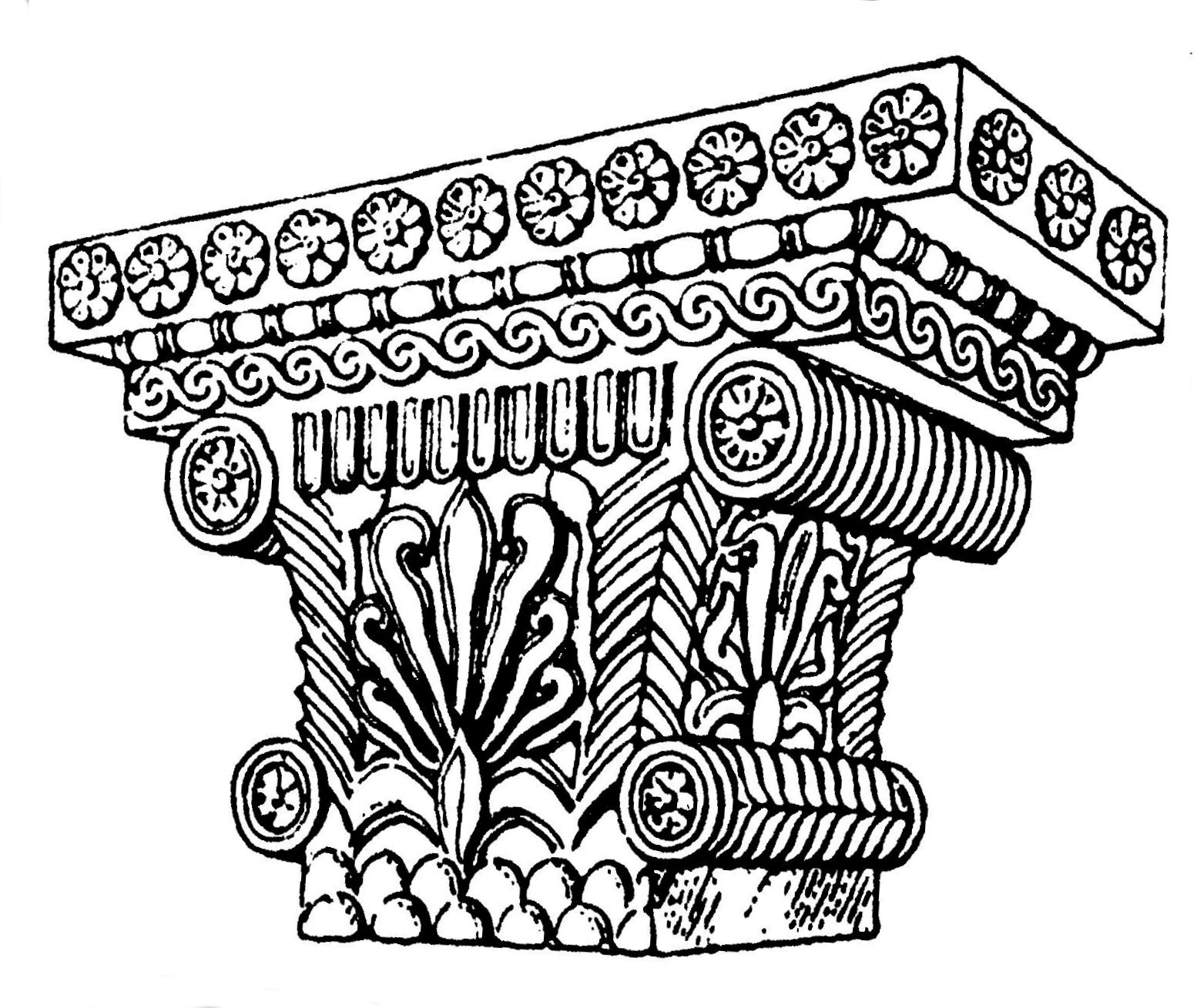
The Pataliputra capital with central flame palmette, a Hellenistic anta capital from India (3rd century BCE).

The Ionic anta capital is very different in that it is very rich in moldings. It remains however essentially brick-shaped. The Ionic anta capitals of the Erechtheion take the shape of very decorated brick-shaped capitals, with designs essentially in the continuity of wall cornices, with some additional horizontal moldings.

Some temples in Ionia tend to have a very different design of anta capital, flat at the fronts but with volutes on the side, giving them the shape of sofas, hence the name they sometimes take of "sofa capitals". In this case the sides of the capital broaden upward, in a shape reminiscent of a couch or sofa. This capital can also be described as pilaster capitals, which, strictly speaking, are normally decorative rather than structural components.

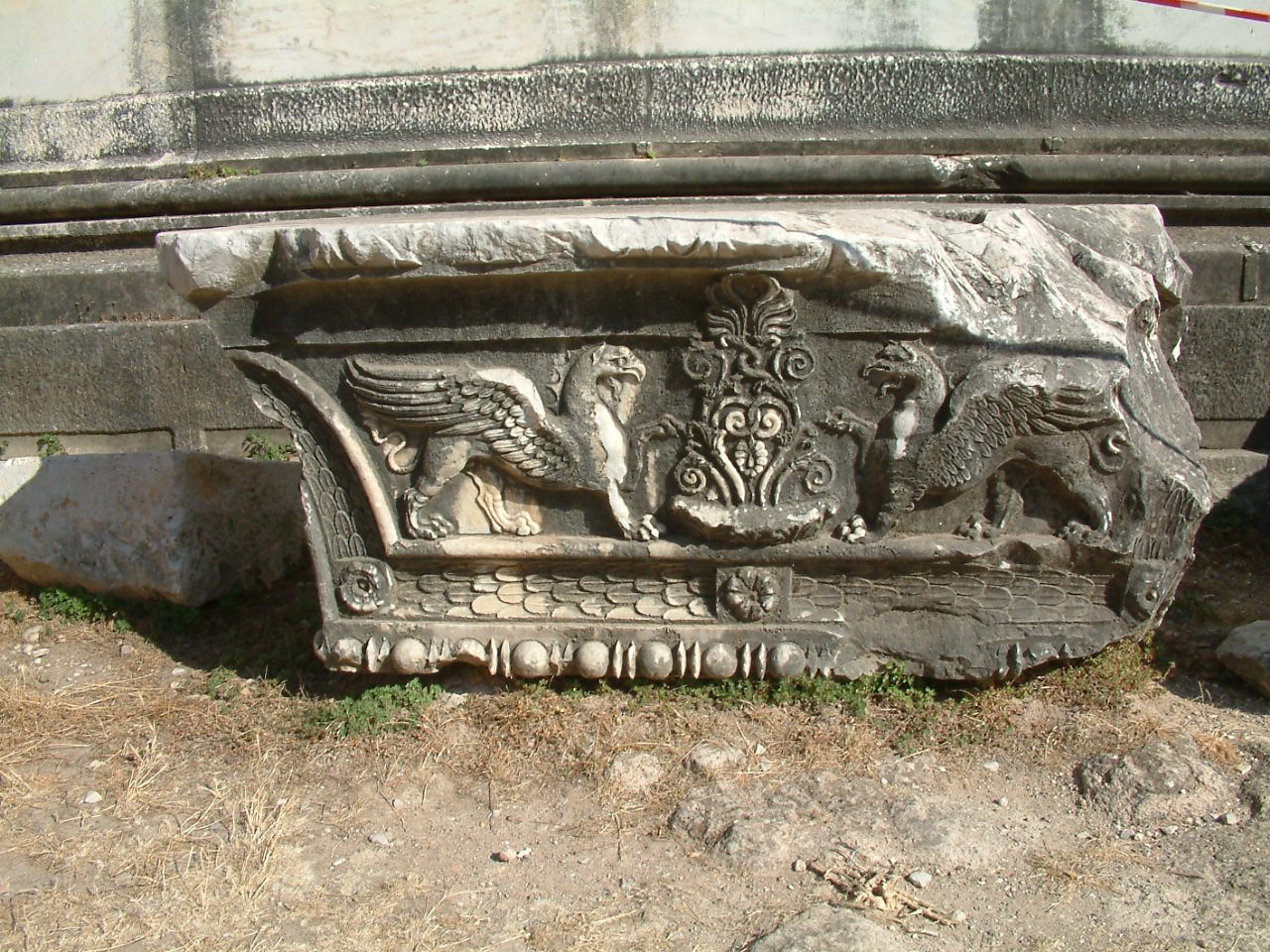
Anta capital, Didyma.

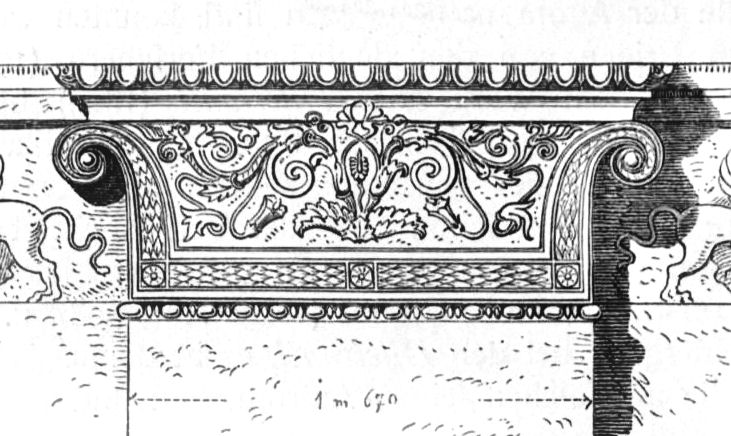
Anta capital from Miletus (front view).

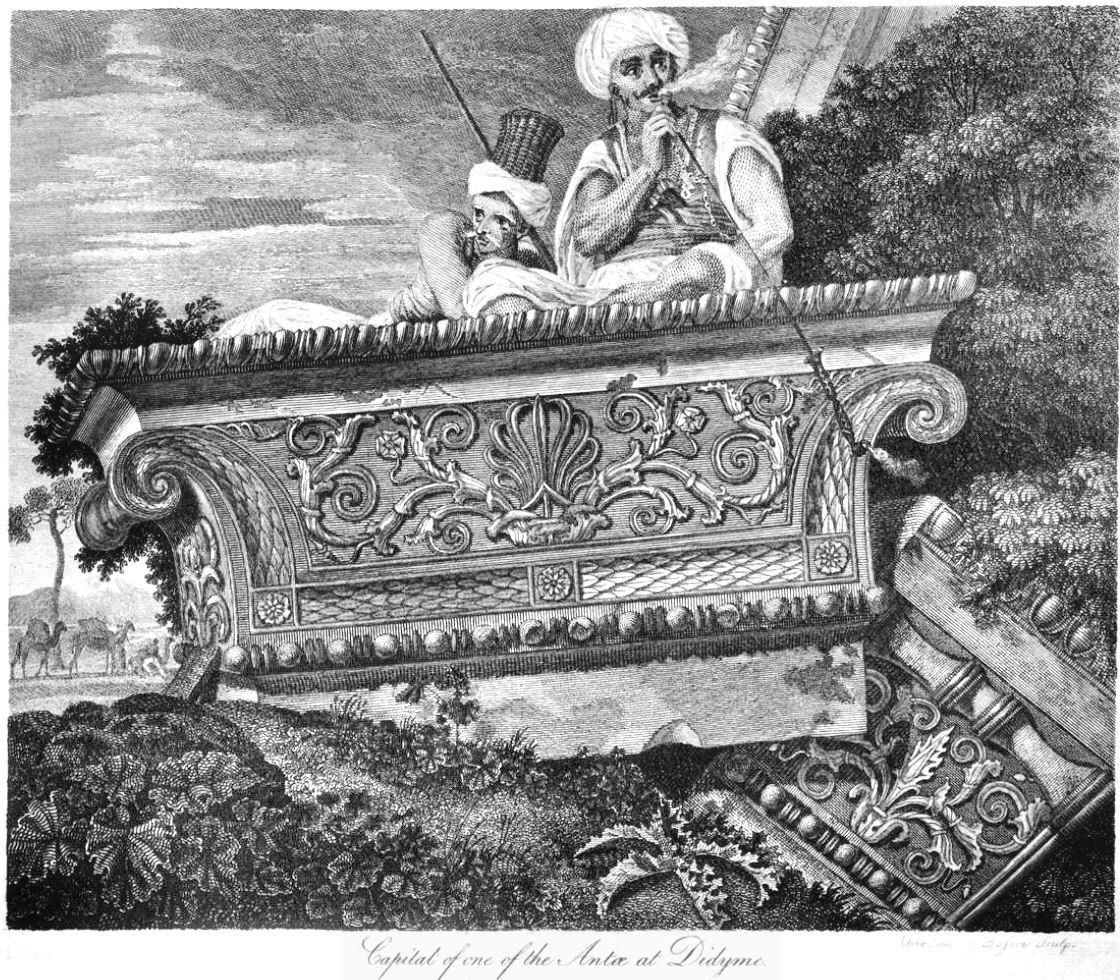
Anta capital at the Temple of Apollo in Didyma, front and profile. 4th century BCE.

In India, an anta capital of a quasi-Ionic type was discovered, and dated to the 3rd century BCE. It has a central flame palmette motif framed by Ionic volutes and placed between horizontal rows of decorative motifs. It is thought that its creation was due to the influence of the neighboring Seleucid Empire, or a nearby Hellenistic city such as Ai-Khanoum.

== Corinthian anta capital ==
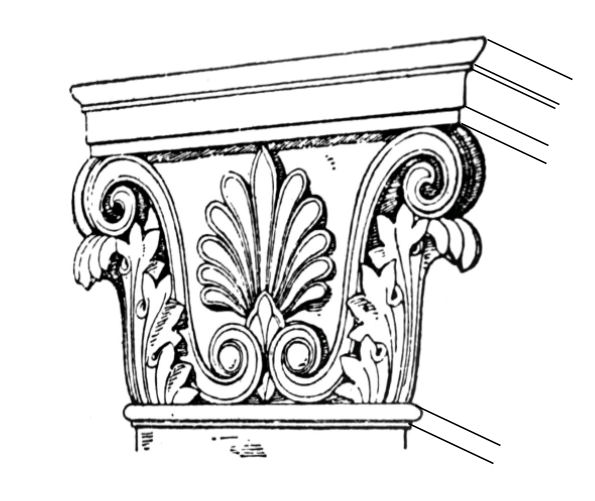
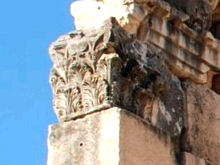
Left image: Greek Corinthian anta capital.
Right image: Corinthian anta capital at the Niha Bekaa Roman Temple, 1st century AD.

Corinthian anta capitals tend to be much closer in design to the capitals of the columns, although often with a flattened composition: during the Greek period, Acanthus leaves are crowned by a central motif, such as a palmette, itself bracketed by volutes. This design was widely adopted in India for Indo-Corinthian capitals.

During the Greek period, anta capitals had designs different from those of column capital, but during Roman and later times this difference disappeared and both column and anta capitals has the same types of designs. At the same time, decorative pilaster designs multiplied during Roman times, so that many of the Corinthian anta capital designs are actually purely decorative pilaster designs.

== See also ==
- Antae temple
