= Flame palmette =

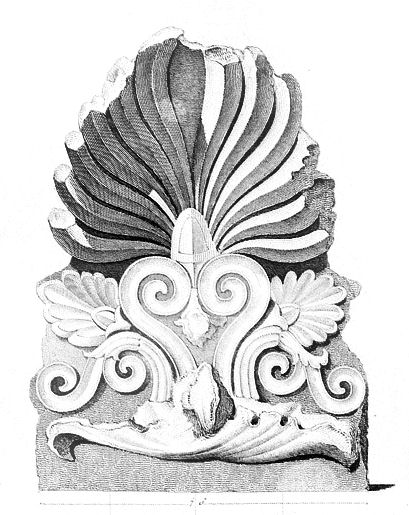
Flame palmette terracotta antefix, Athens.

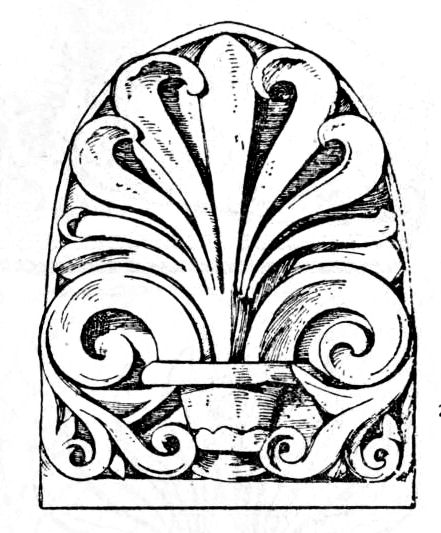
Flame palmette antefix, Temple of Jupiter Stator, Rome.

The flame palmette is a motif in decorative art which, in its most characteristic expression, resembles the fan-shaped leaves of a palm tree. Flame palmettes are different from regular palmettes in that, traditionally palmettes tended to have sharply splaying leaves. From the 4th century BCE however, the end of the leaves tend to turn in, forming what is called the "flame palmette" design.

== Greece ==
The first appearance of flame palmettes seem to occur with the stand-alone floral akroteria of the Parthenon (447–432 BCE), and slightly later at the Temple of Athena Nike. Flame palmettes were then introduced into friezes of floral motifs in replacement of the regular palmette. According to John Boardman, although lotus friezes or palmette friezes were known in Mesopotamia centuries before, the unnatural combination of various botanical elements which have no relationship in the wild, such as the palmette, the lotus, and sometimes rosette flowers, is a purely Greek innovation, which was then adopted on a very broad geographical scale. However, Ashurbanipal's threshold from Dur Sharrugin predates all Greek examples of the flame palmette.

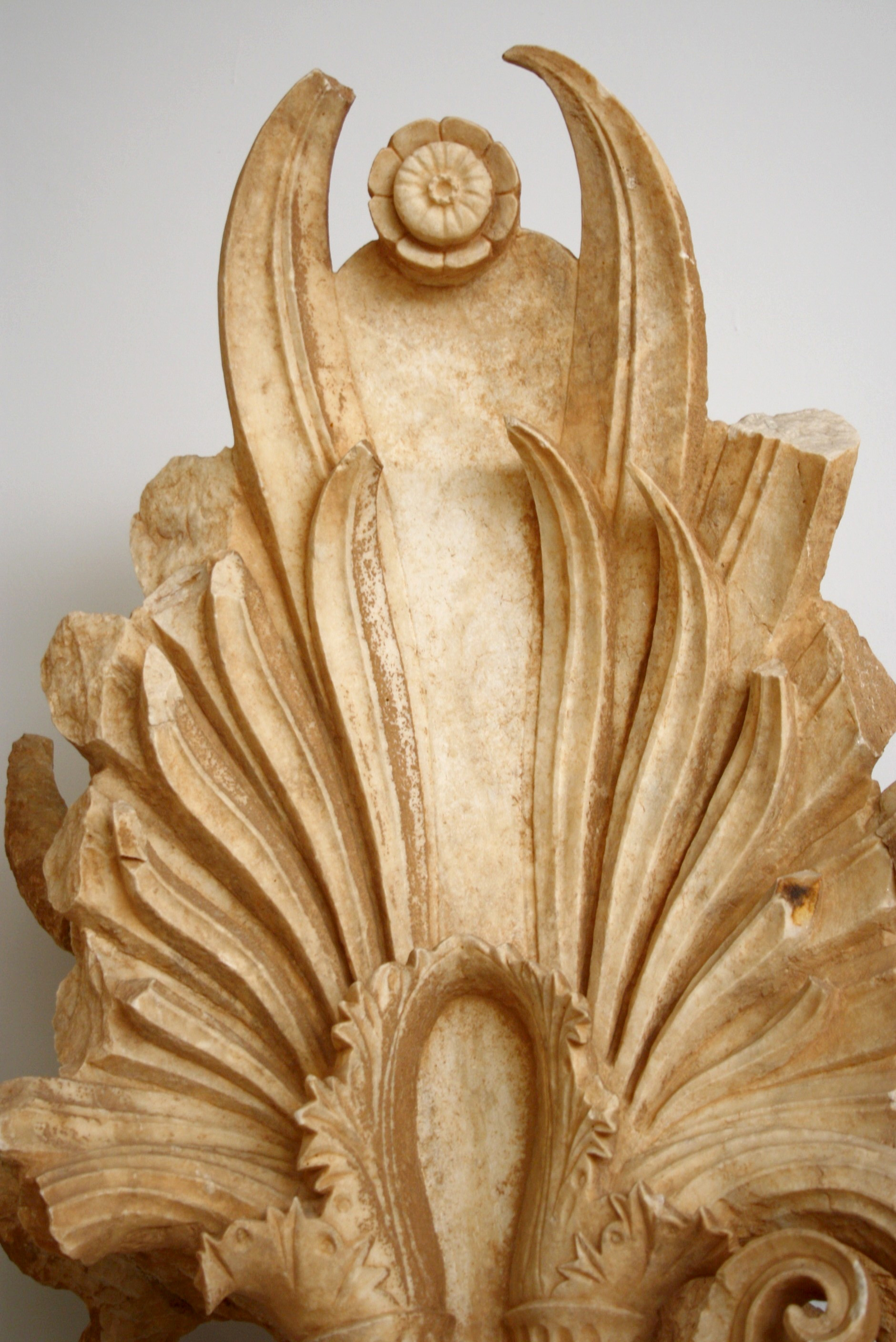
Stele anthemion, 4th century BCE, Athens.

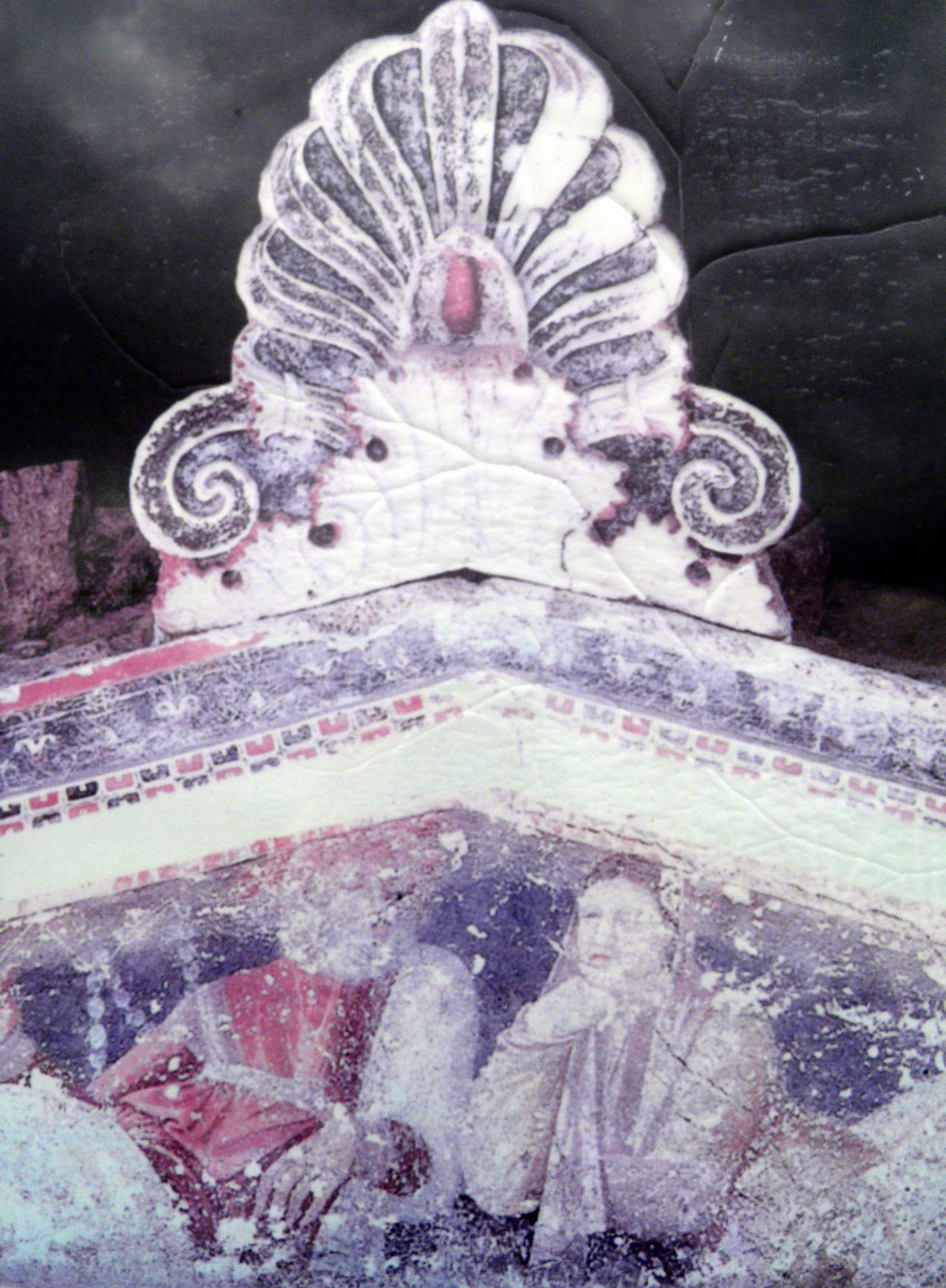
A flame palmette at the Tomb of the Palmettes, first half of the 3rd century BCE, Mieza

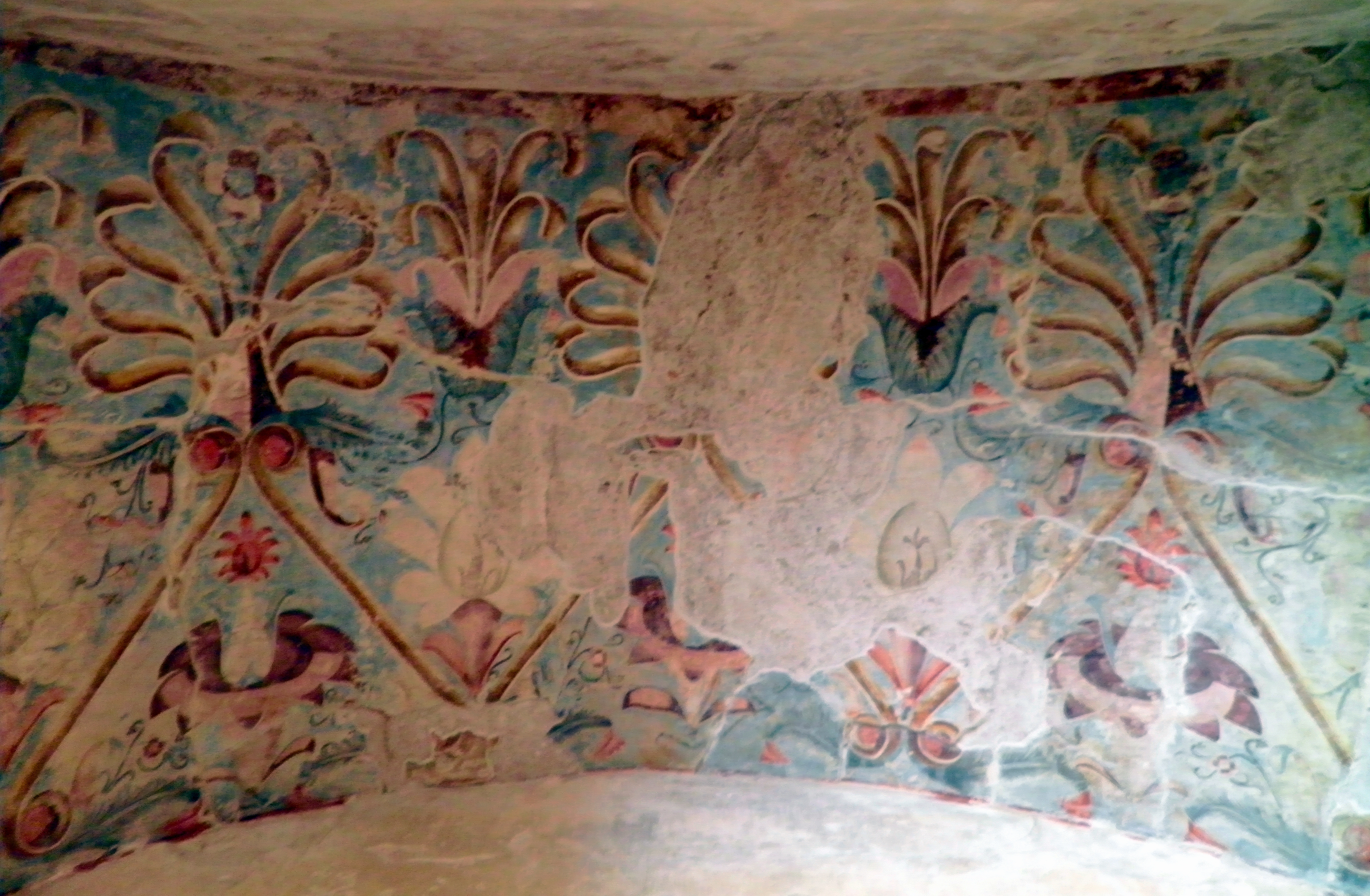
Flame palmettes at the Tomb of the Palmettes, first half of the 3rd century BCE, Mieza

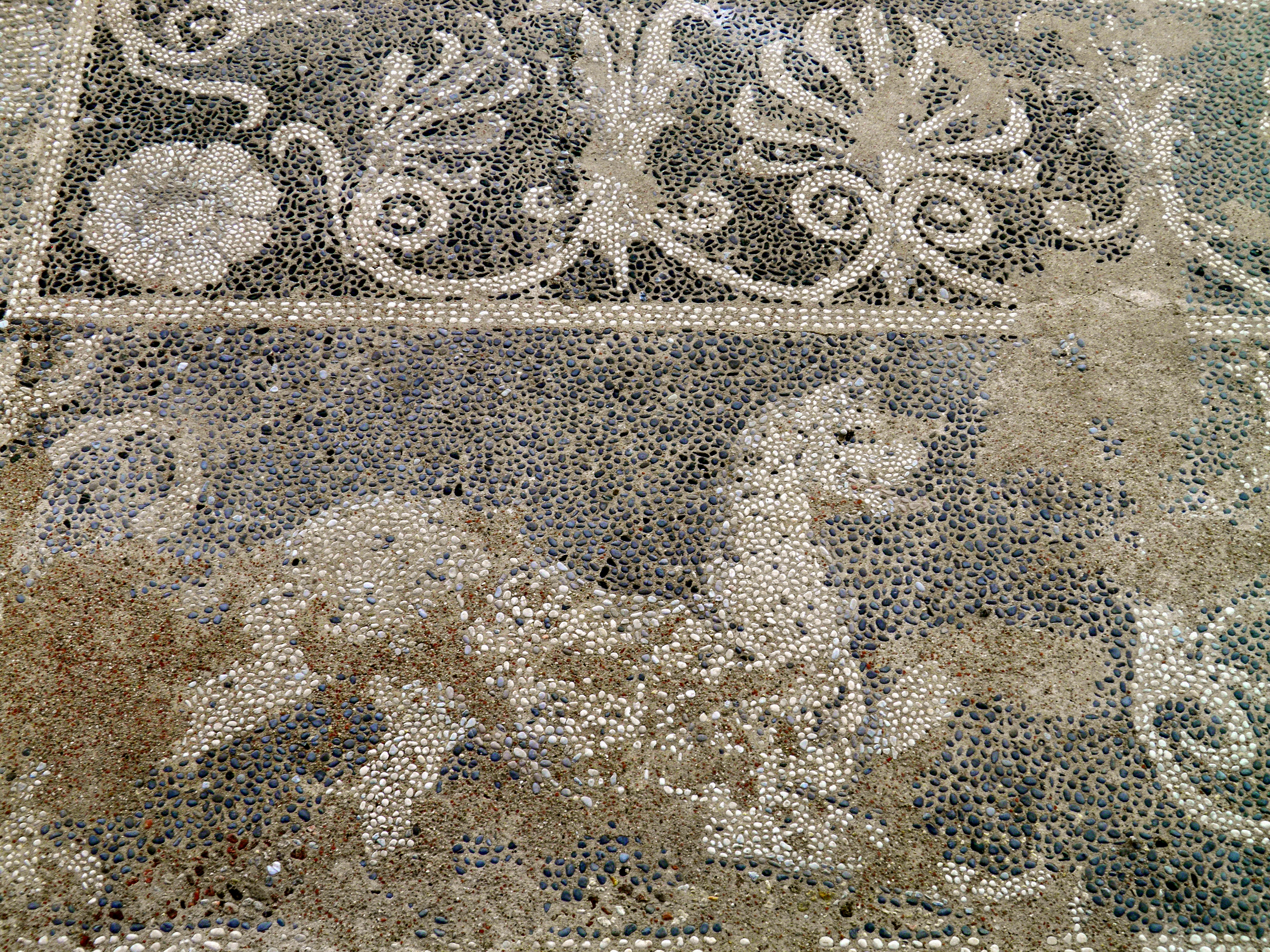
Detail of mosaic. Ancient Pella

== Asia Minor ==
In Asia Minor, some of the earliest designs of flaming palmettes can be found in the Mausoleum at Halicarnassus, dated to 350 BCE. They are also extensively used at the 3rd century BCE Ionic Temple of Didyma.

Flame palmettes in Asia Minor
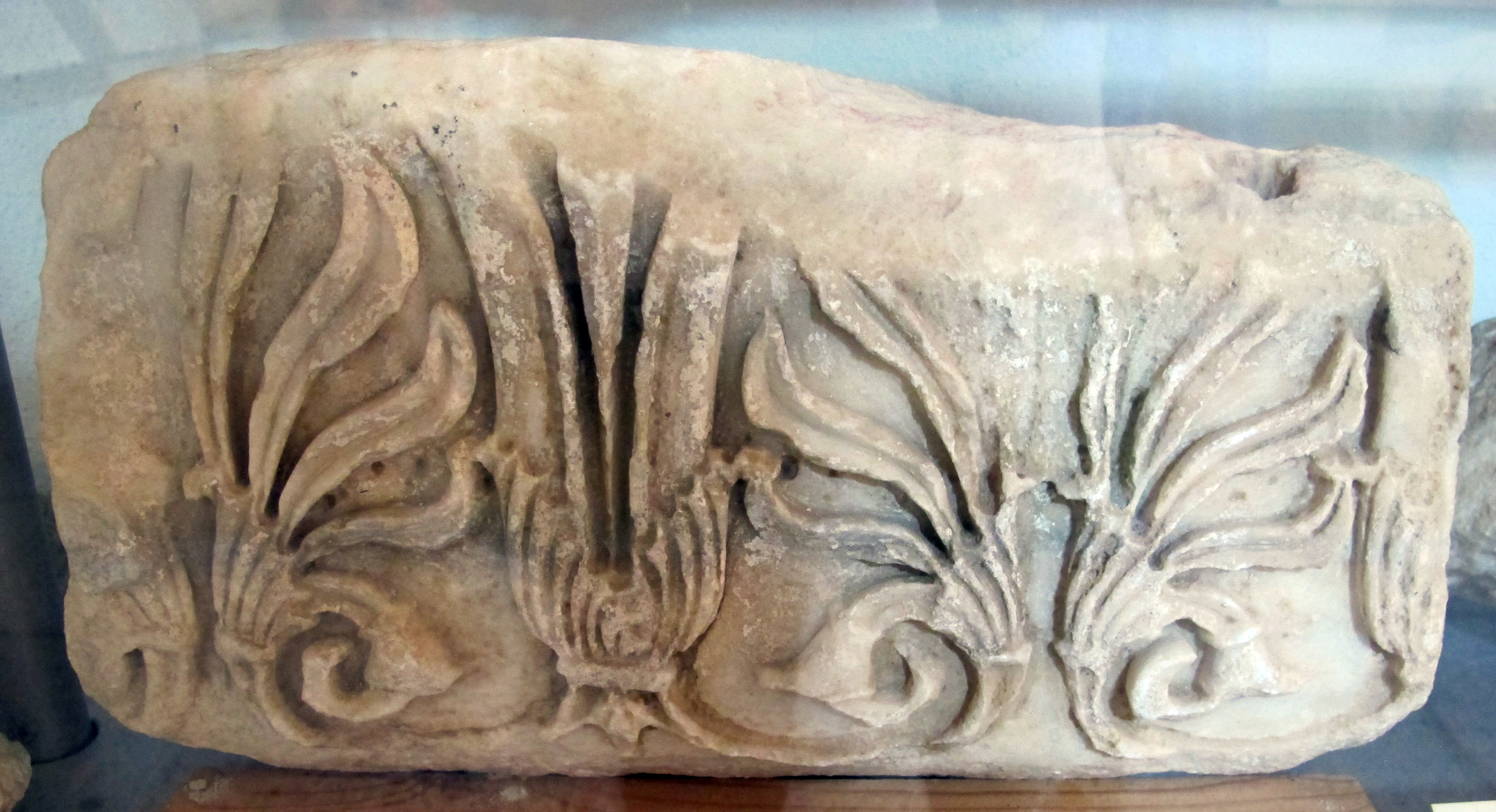
Fragment of frieze with flame palmette design, Mausoleum at Halicarnassus, 350 BCE.

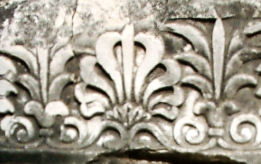
"Flame palmette" design (center) at Didyma, 3rd century BCE.

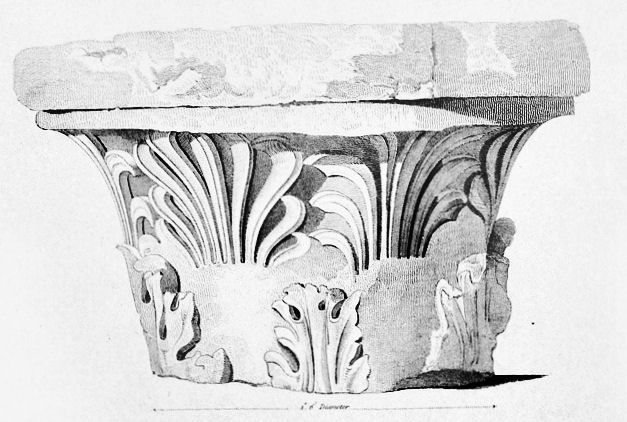
Anta capital with flame palmette, Didyma, Miletus.

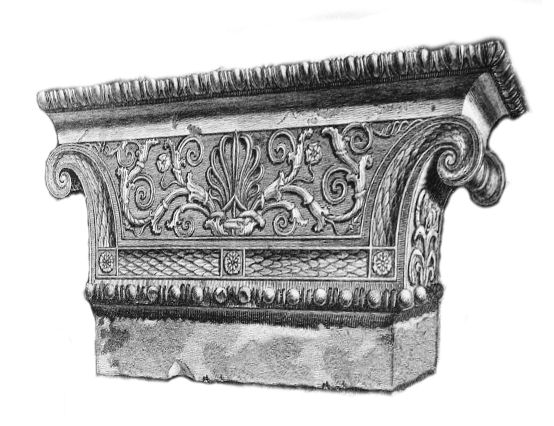
Anta capital in Didyma.

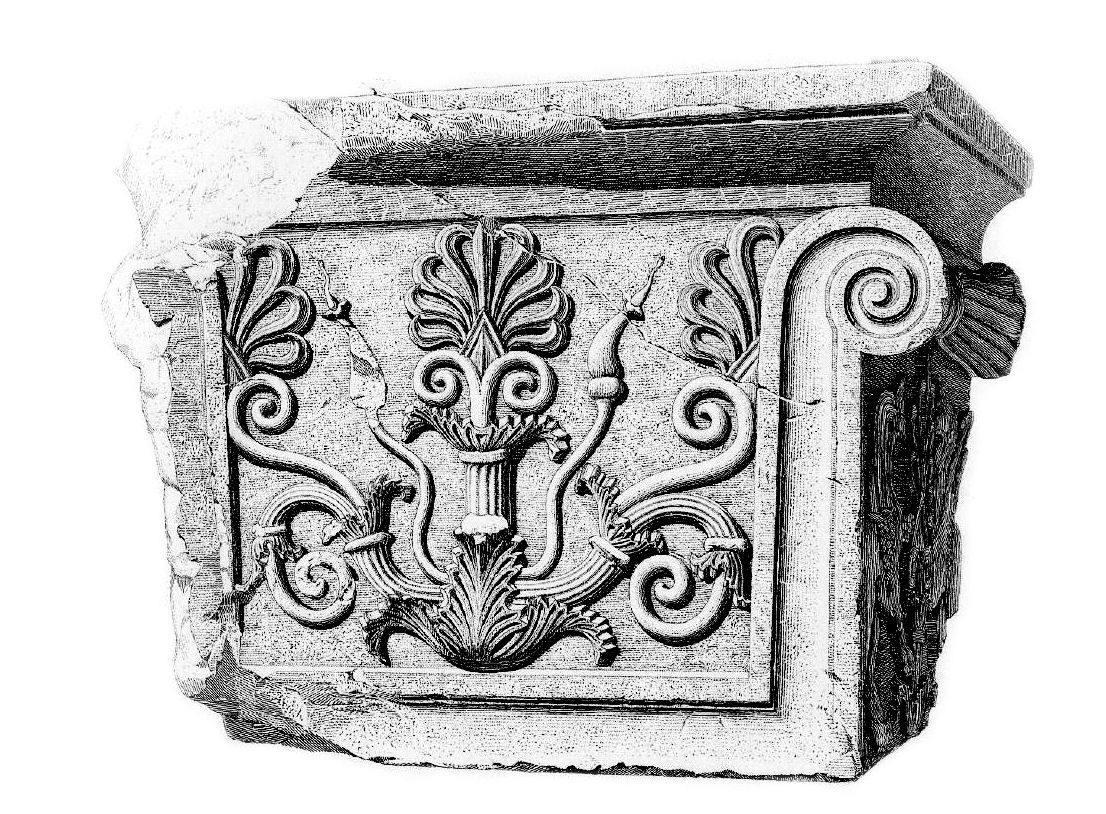
Capital in Priene.

== Greco-Bactria ==
The flame palmette design that was adopted in Hellenistic architecture and became very popular on a wide geographical scale, especially following the conquests of Alexander the Great. In the Greco-Bactrian city of Ai-Khanoum, founded circa 280 BCE, the antefixae display a flame palmette design, as do floral mosaics.

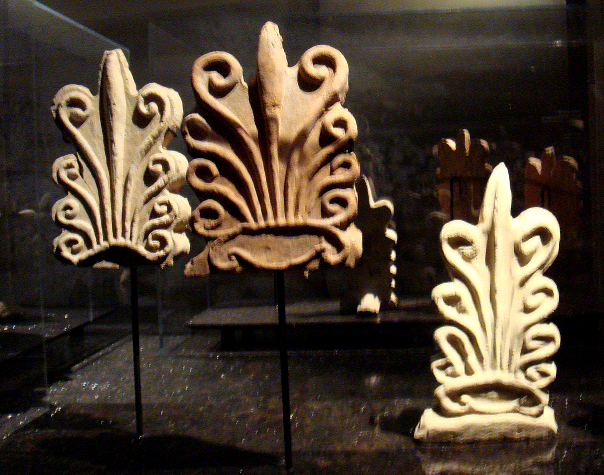
Architectural antefixae with Hellenistic "Flame palmette" design, Ai-Khanoum.

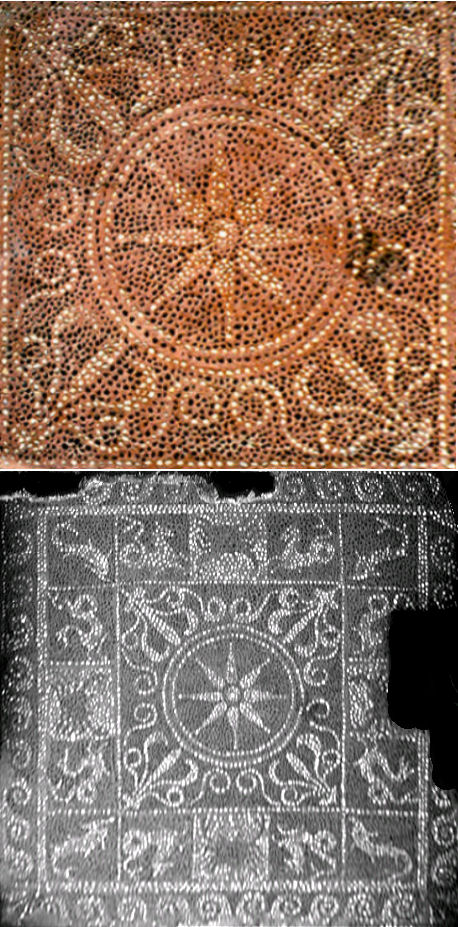
Ai- Khanoum mosaic (central detail in color).

== India ==
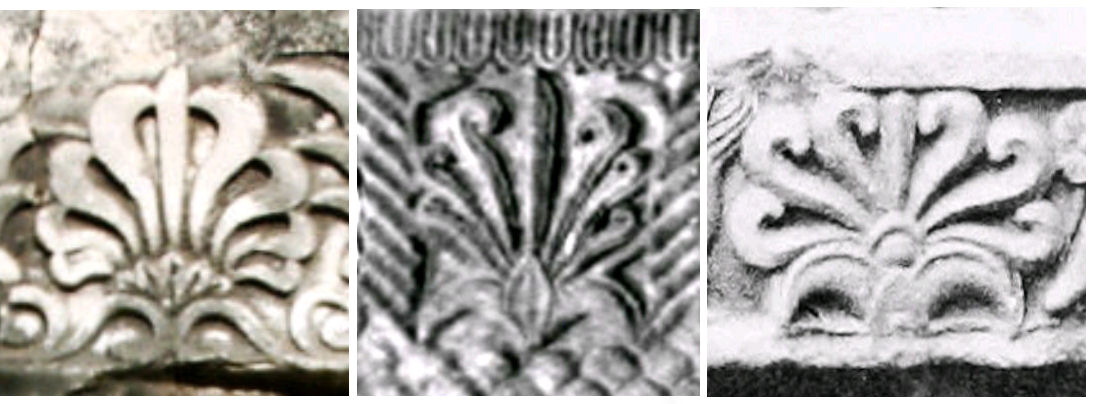
Greek and Indian flame palmettes. Left: Flame palmette at Didyma, Ionia, c.300 BCE. Middle: Pataliputra capital, India, 3rd c.BCE. Right: Ashoka's Diamond throne, Bodh Gaya, India, 250 BCE.

This is the design that was adopted by India in the 3rd century BCE for some of its sculptural friezes, such as on the abaci of the Pillars of Ashoka, or the central design of the Pataliputra capital, probably through the Seleucid Empire or Hellenistic cities such as Ai-Khanoum.

Flame palmettes in India
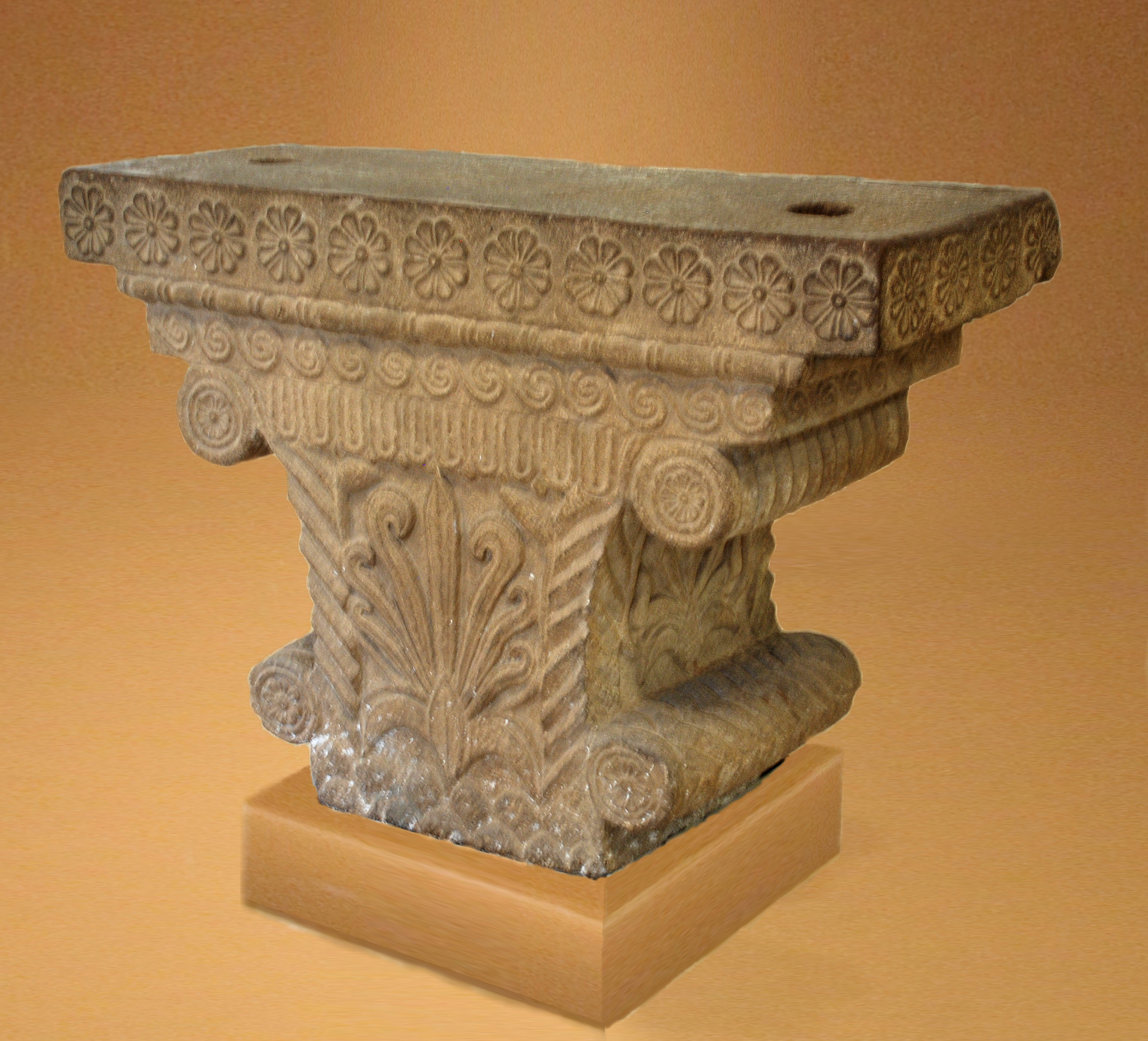
The Pataliputra capital, with a central and a lateral "flame palmette" design, 3rd century BCE.

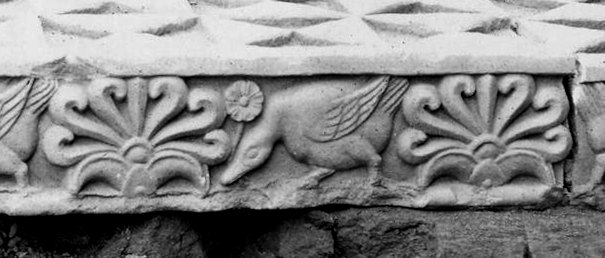
Diamond throne frieze detail, Bodh Gaya, c.250 BCE.

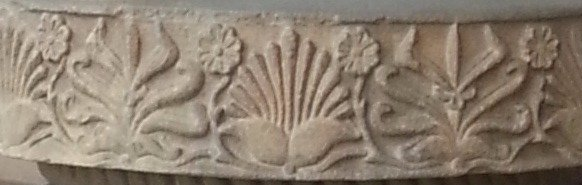
"Flame palmettes" around a lotus, on the Rampurva bull capital, India, 3rd century BCE

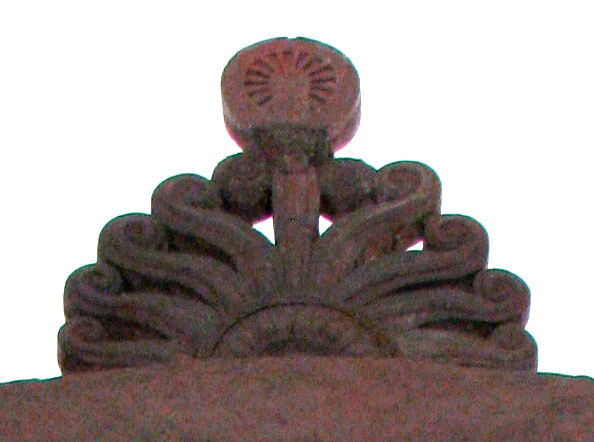
Flame palmette on top of Bharhut east gateway.

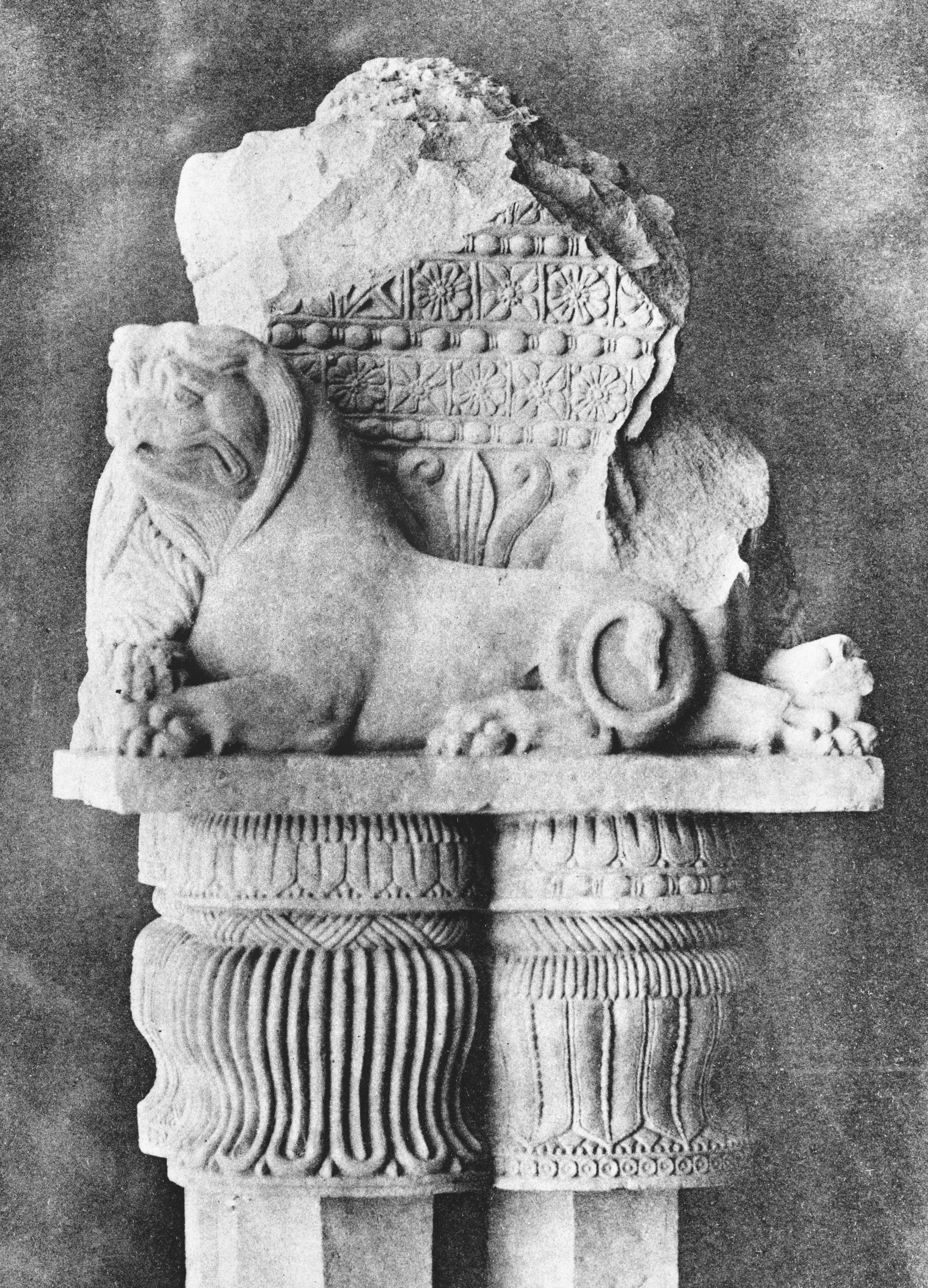
Bharhut pillar capital with central flame palmette, circa 100 BCE.

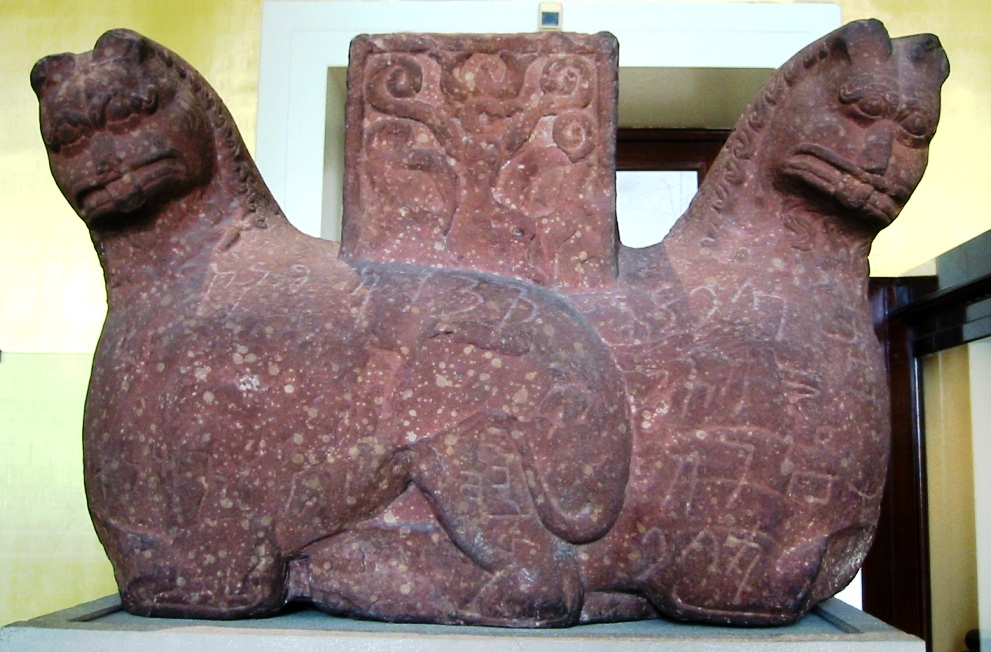
The Mathura lion capital with a central flame palmette. 1st century BCE.

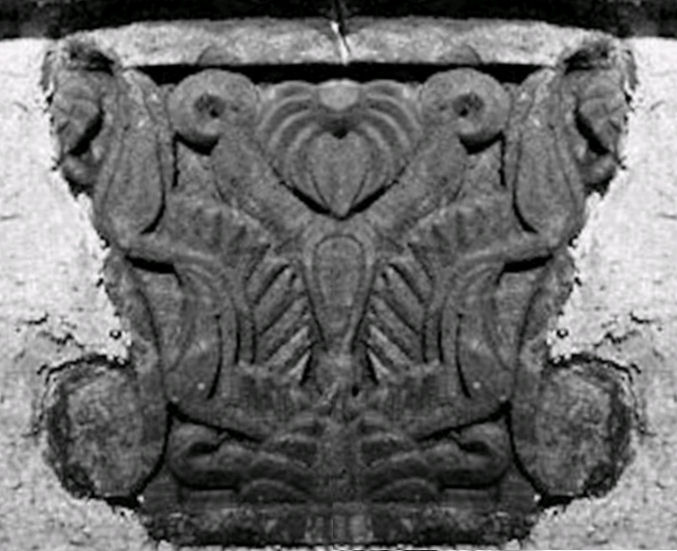
Sunga flame palmette, 1st century BCE, Bodh Gaya.

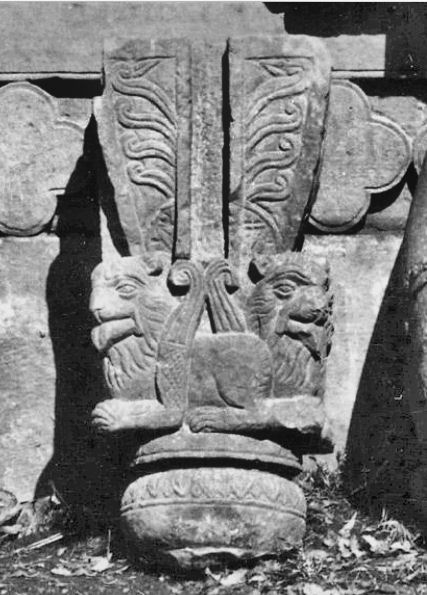
Kushan flame palmette.

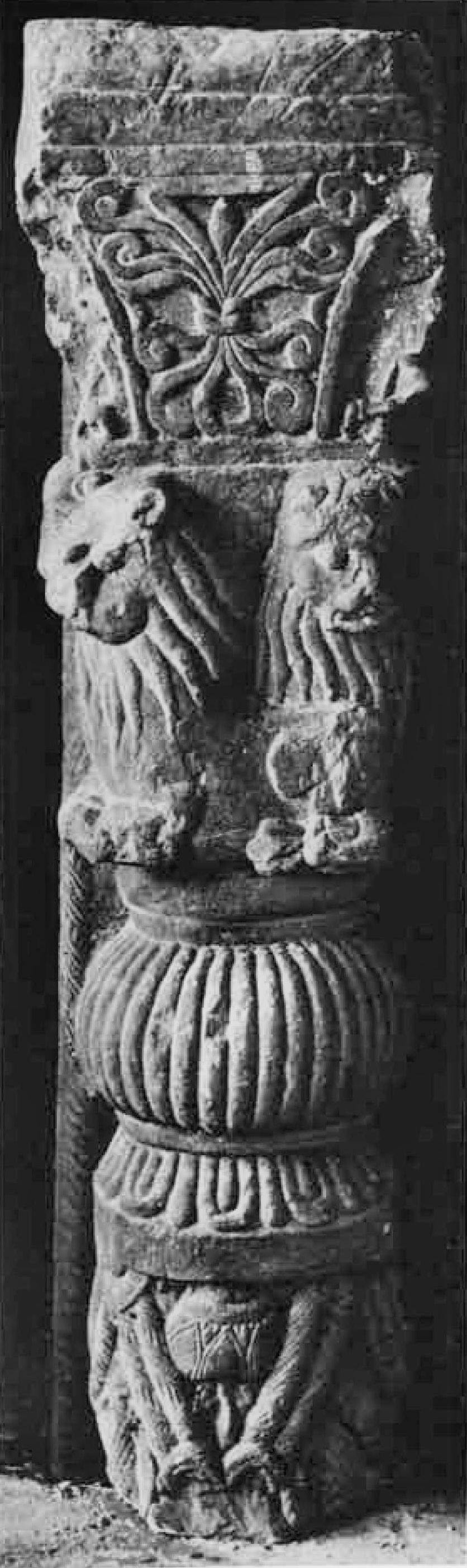
Pillaster, Mathura, 2nd century CE.
