= Vajrasana, Bodh Gaya =

Stone slab at the spot where the Buddha meditated under the Bodhi tree

Vajrasana Diamond Throne
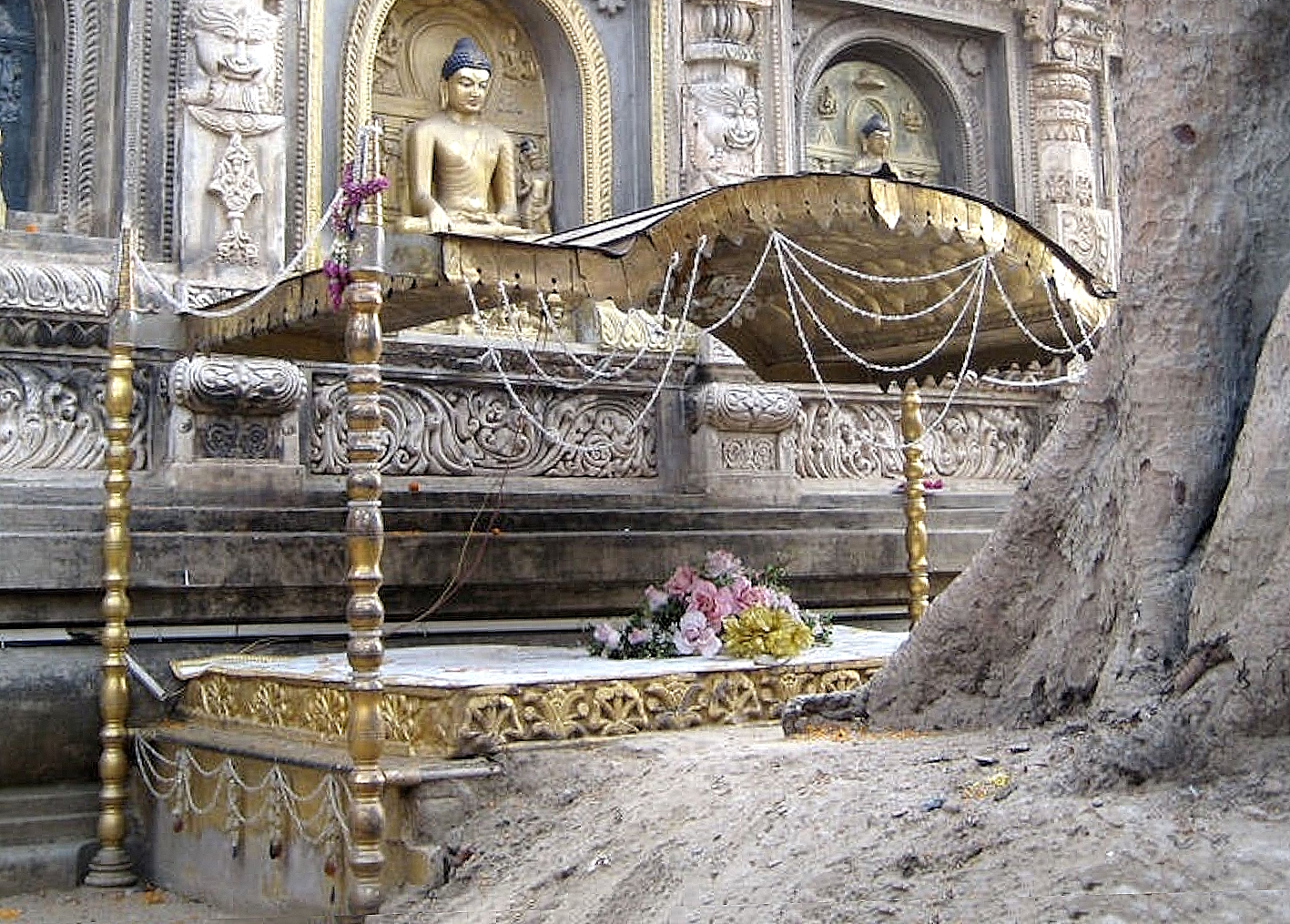
- Vajrasana covered in gold foil, in Bodh Gaya
- Material: Polished sandstone
- Period/culture: circa 250 BCE
- Place: Bodh Gaya, Bihar, India
- Present location: 24.6960°N 84.9912°E

Location

The Vajrasana (IAST: vajrāsana; diamond throne), or Enlightenment Throne of the Buddha, is an ancient stone slab located under the Bodhi tree, directly beside the Mahabodhi Temple at Bodh Gaya. It is considered as the bodhimanda (bodhimaṇḍa; seat or platform of enlightenment) of Gautama Buddha. The slab is presumed to have been placed at the location during the reign of Maurya king Ashoka between 250–233 BCE, at the spot where the Buddha meditated.

The empty throne was a focus of devotion in early Buddhism, treated as a cetiya or symbolic relic. It was not intended to be occupied, but operated as a symbol of the missing Buddha. Devotees often kneel in prayer before it. Being the site where Gautama Buddha achieved liberation, Tibetan Buddhist texts also use the term vajrasana to refer to Bodh Gaya itself.

== The throne ==
=== Discovery ===
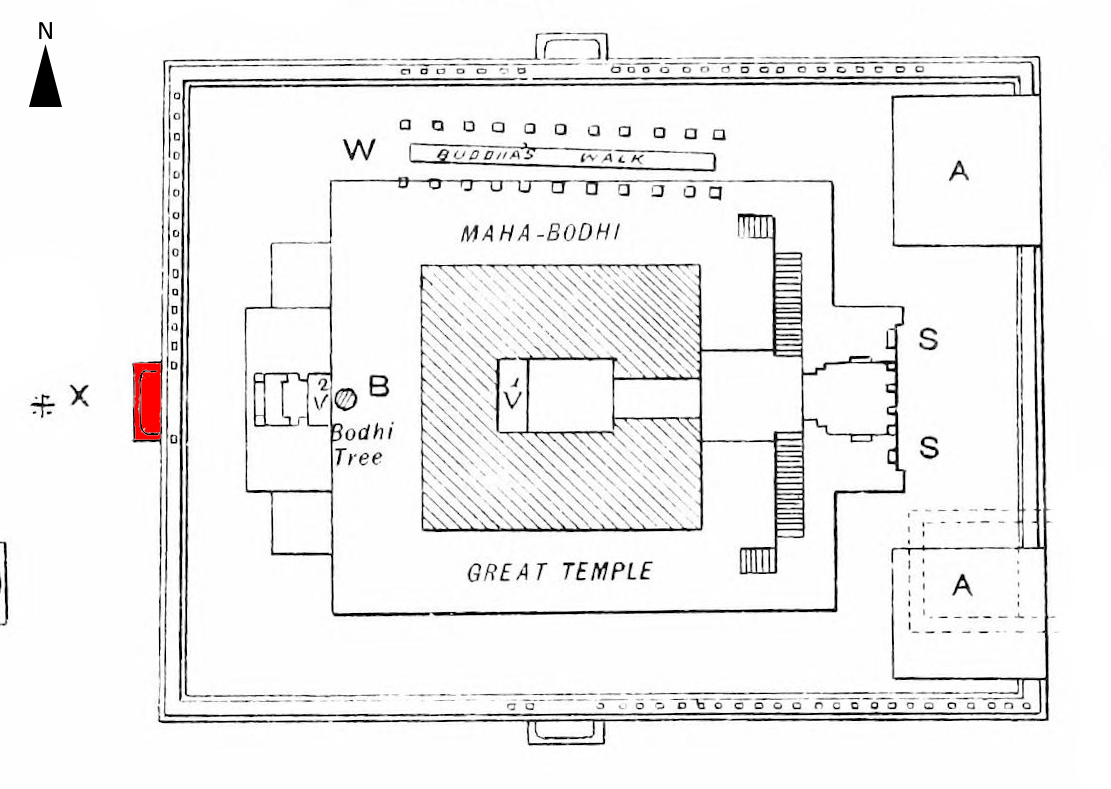
Location of the Diamond Throne ( ) on the western side of the Mahabodhi Temple, Bodh Gaya

The Vajrasana, together with the remnants of the ancient temple built by Ashoka, was excavated by archaeologist Alexander Cunningham (1814-1893), who published his discovery and related research of the Mahabodhi Temple in his 1892 book Mahâbodhi, or the great Buddhist temple under the Bodhi tree at Buddha-Gaya.

The Vajrasana was encased under a massive and much posterior statue of the Buddha in the middle of the western wall of the temple.

=== Description ===
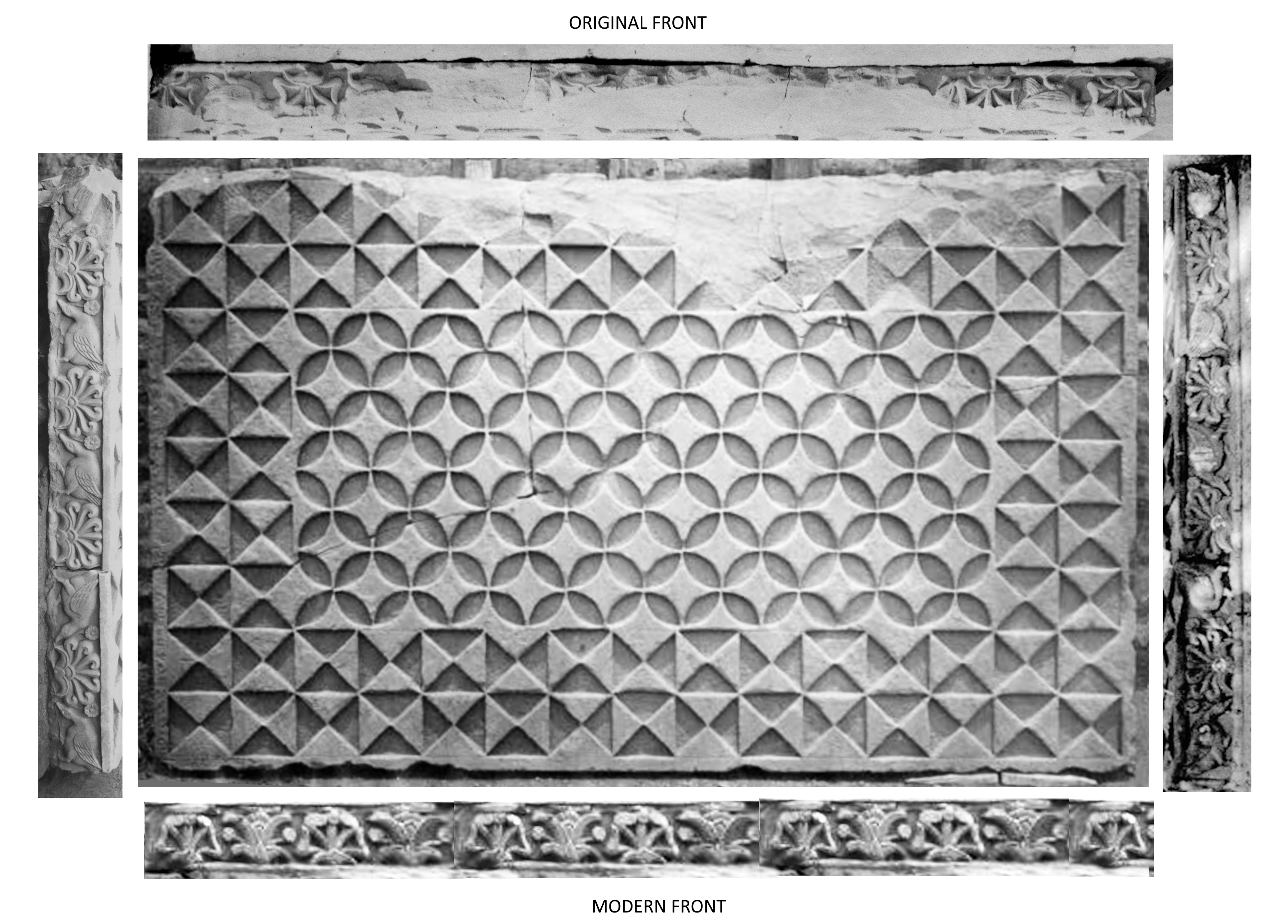
Vajrasana: top slab with side panels (3rd century BCE). Bodh Gaya

As it survives now, the Vajrasana is a thick slab of polished grey sandstone, 7 feet 10-inches long by 4 feet 7-inches broad, and 6-inches thick. The whole top surface was carved with geometrical patterns, circular in the middle, with a double border of squares.

Chinese Monks who made pilgrimages to Bodh Gaya prior to the 14th century are a very accurate and valuable primary source because they recorded and kept descriptions of Vajrasana, Faxian writes that the Diamond Throne was stone seat that's width was 4-5 chi which in modern day measurements is equal to 1.3-1.6 meters. According to Xuanzang who visited Vajrasana in the 7th century says "The diamond throne is of a yellowish stone, smooth and bright as polished mirror".

The sculpted decorations on the Diamond Throne echo the decorations found on the Pillars of Ashoka. It has decorative bands on the sides with carvings of honeysuckles and geese, which can also be found on several of the pillar capitals of Ashoka, such as the Rampurva capitals, and also pigeons on the back relief, nowadays hidden from view. The geese (hamsa) in particular are a very recurrent symbol on the pillars of Ashoka, and may refer to the devotees flocking to the faith. The same throne is also illustrated in later reliefs from Bharhut, dated to circa 100 BCE.

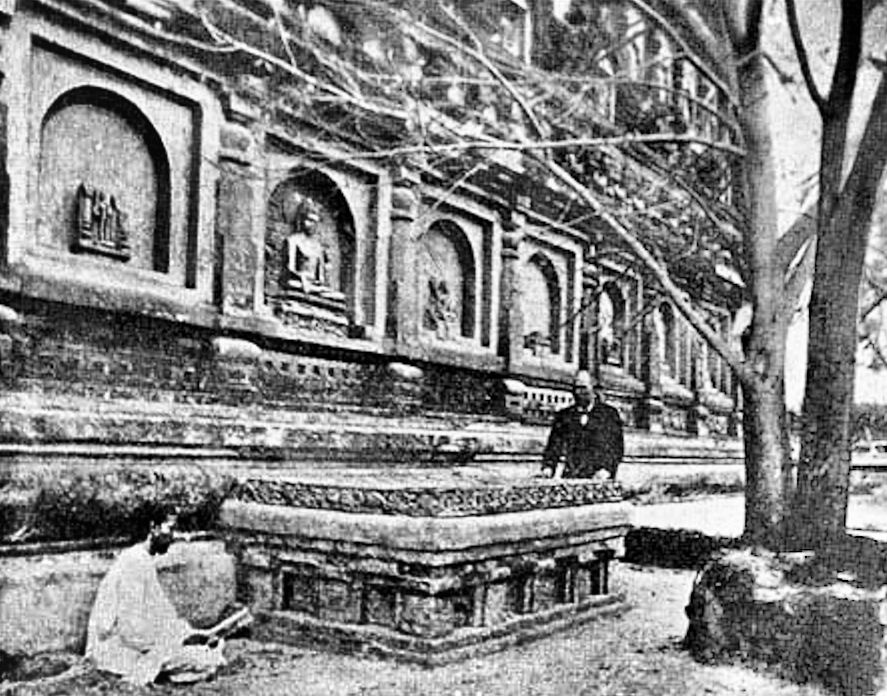
Anagarika Dharmapala (1864-1933) at the Vajrasana. The throne appears clearly in its exact shape, with supporting columns.

The long frieze at the front is slightly different, and consists in stylized lotuses with multiple calices, alternating with "flame palmettes" of a slightly simpler design than on the sides. A rather similar design can also be seen in the lost frieze of the Allahabad pillar of Ashoka.

The Vajrasana has carvings on all sides, suggesting that the original temple built by Ashoka (bodhigriha) was open on all sides, a hammiya structure. The small statues at the foot of the throne are of a later date, probably Kushan or Gupta.

=== Rotation of the slab in modern times ===
Upon discovery, the front of the slab was found to be decorated with alternating pigeons and flame palmettes, but it was badly damaged on most of its length. A decision was made to rotate the slab, so that the less damaged back portion could appear at the front instead. The back portion, with alternating flame palmettes and lotuses, is now positioned at the front, and the former front portion with the pigeons is now hidden from view. As a consequence the southern and northern shorter sides were also inverted due to the rotation, but their decoration is identical, consisting in alternating geese and flame palmettes, with only minor stylistic variations.

=== Ashoka ===
The Diamond Throne and the Pillars of Ashoka

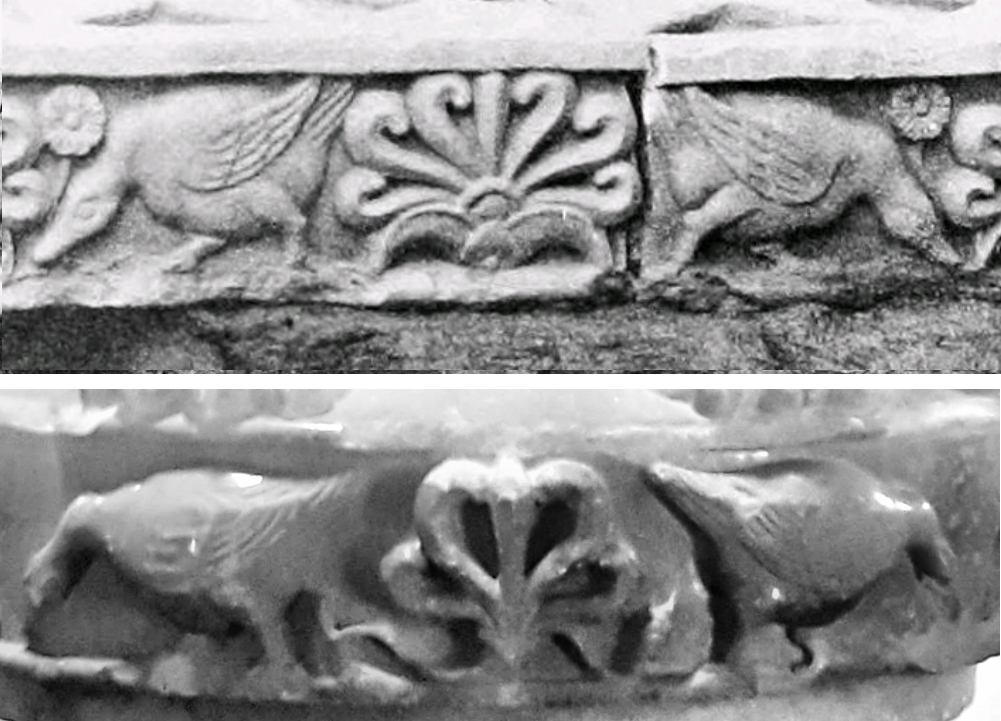
Side decorative bands of the Diamond Throne (top) and the Sanchi pillar capital (bottom), both featuring geese and flame palmettes.

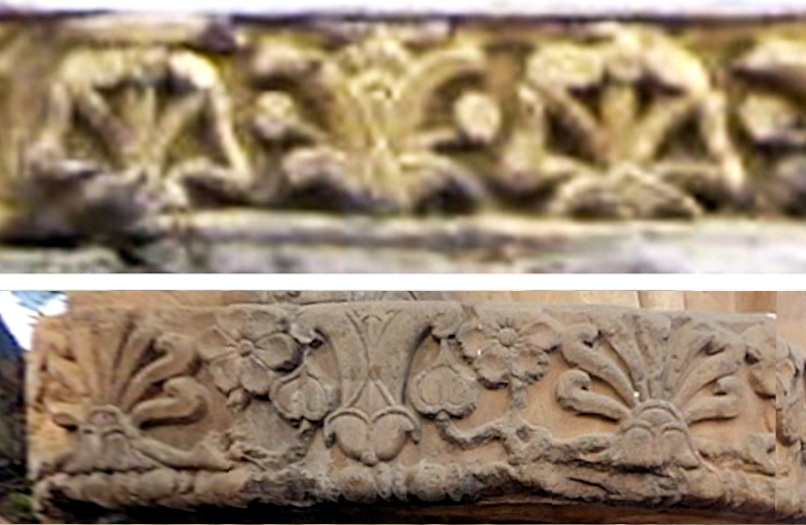
Front decorative friezes of the Diamond Throne (top) and the Sankissa pillar capital (bottom), both alternating flame palmettes, rosettes and lotuses.

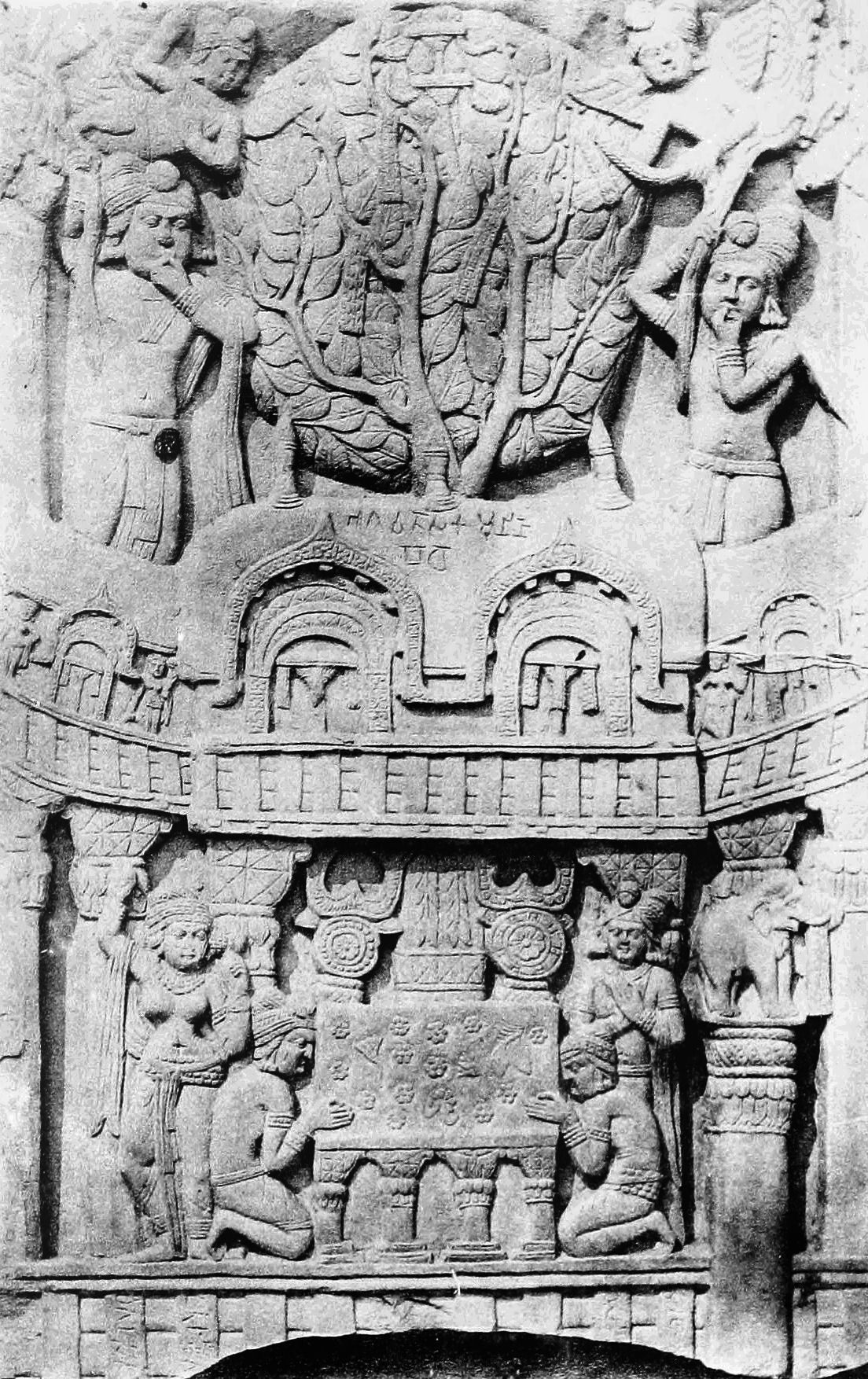
Bharhut relief with the Vajrasana (similar to the Anagarika Dharmapala photograph with its supporting columns), and the Mahabodhi Temple around the Bodhi Tree (2nd century BCE).

The Vajrasana was built by Ashoka when he first established the Bodh Gaya temple around the Bodhi tree, in order to mark the place where the Buddha reached enlightenment. Ashoka is thought to have visited Bodh Gaya around 260 BCE, about 10 years into his reign, as explained by his Rock Edict number VIII. He describes his visit to Bodh Gaya, known in ancient times as Sambodhi (complete enlightenment) or Uruvela (Original ancient name of Bodh Gaya, as mentioned in Pali Canon's Paṭhamauruvelasutta of the Anguttara Nikaya, Bodhi Sutta of the Khuddaka Nikaya and many other Pali Suttas (Sutras)):

In times past the Devanampriyas (Kings) used to set out on so-called pleasure-tours. On these (tours) hunting and other such pleasures were (enjoyed). When king Devanampriya Priyadarsin had been anointed ten years, he went out to Sambodhi. Therefore tours of morality (were undertaken) here. On these (tours) the following takes place, (viz.) visiting Sramanas and Brahmanas and making gifts (to them), visiting the aged and supporting (them) with gold, visiting the people of the country, instructing (them) in morality, and questioning (them) about morality, as suitable for this (occasion). This second period (of the reign) of king Devanampriya Priyadarsin becomes a pleasure in a higher degree.

— 8th Major Rock Edict. Translation by E. Hultzsch. Inscriptions of Asoka p.36-37

The throne was initially found hidden behind a bigger throne of the Kushan period, and an even bigger one, probably from the Pala period. It is thought that the Vajrasana was initially located at the bottom of the original Bodhi tree. The slab is made of polished sandstone and dated to the time of Ashoka. This is the oldest known piece of architecture at Bodh Gaya.

=== Bharhut relief illustrating the Vajrasana ===
According to the inscribed Bharhut relief related to the Vajrasana, the original Mahabodhi Temple of Asoka was an open pavilion supported on pillars. In the middle is seen the Vajrasana decorated in front with four flat pilasters. Behind the Throne appears the trunk of the Bodhi Tree, which rises up high above the building, and on each side of the Tree is a combined symbol of the Triratna and the Dharmachakra, standing on the top of a short pillar. On each side of the Vajrasana room is a side room of the same style. The top of the Throne is ornamented with flowers, but there is no figure of Buddha.

The relief bears the inscription: "bhagavato sakamunino bodho" ("The Bodhi (Tree) of the divine Shakyamuni", or "The illumination of the Blessed Shakyamuni"), thereby confirming the meaning of the relief.

== Characteristics ==
The Vajrasana and its main components, Mahabodhi Temple, Bodh Gaya
Discovery of the Vajrasana (original southern side, now positioned on the northern side after rotation). The pedestal statues date to the Gupta period.	Front frieze of the Vajrasana: lotuses with multiple calices, alternating with "flame palmettes" (formerly positioned in the back). Original front frieze detail: pigeons and flame palmettes (now in the back) Original southern side frieze detail: geese and flame palmettes (now northern side)

== Offerings ==
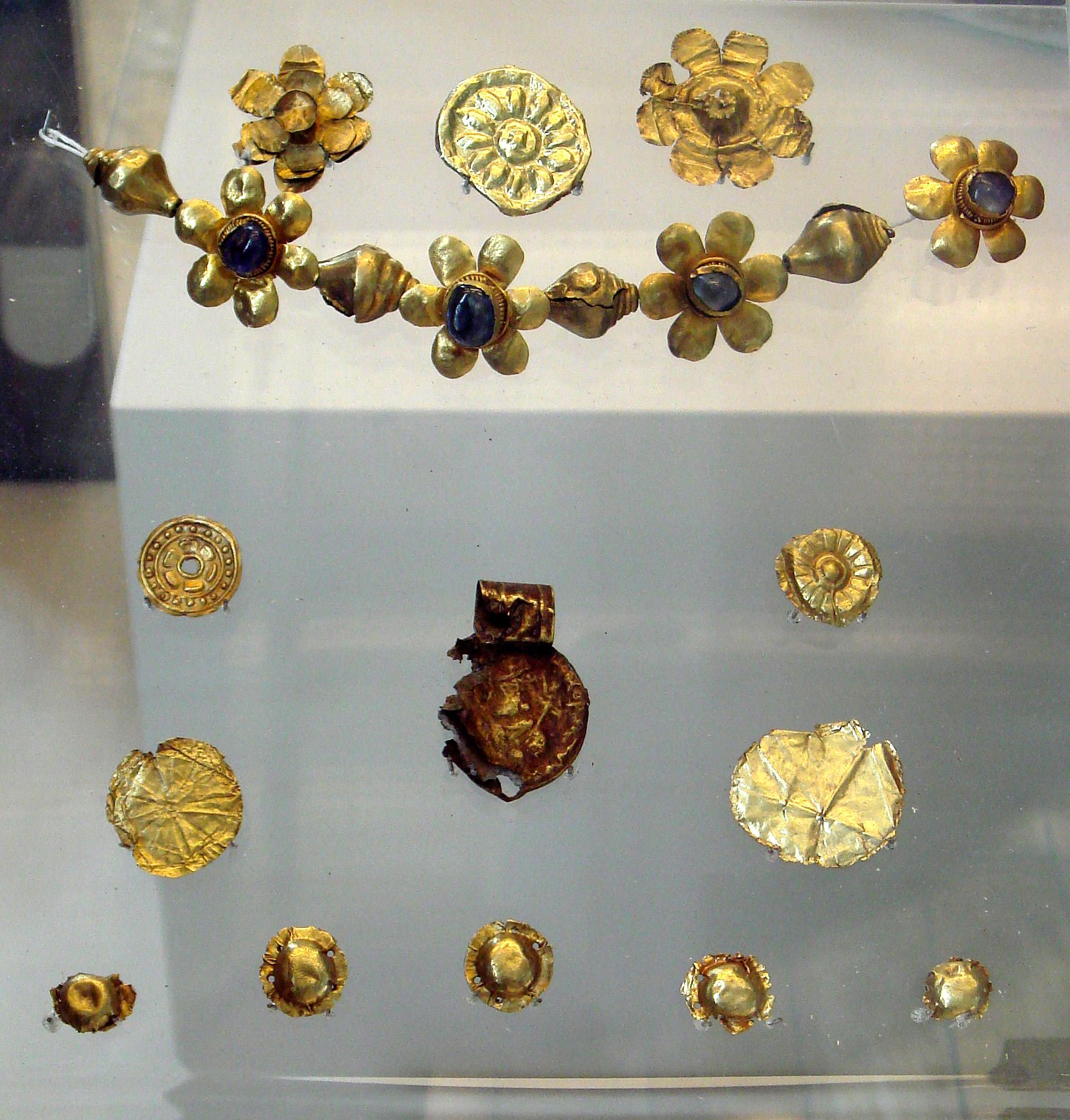
Offerings found in Bodh Gaya under the "Enlightenment Throne of the Buddha", with a decorated coin of the Kushan emperor Huvishka, 3rd century CE. British Museum.

Various gold objects and a talisman with the impression of the bust of the Kushan ruler Huvishka were found buried under the Vajrasana.

Besides the coin of Huvishka, several other coins of the Mauryan Empire period were also found in the treasure.

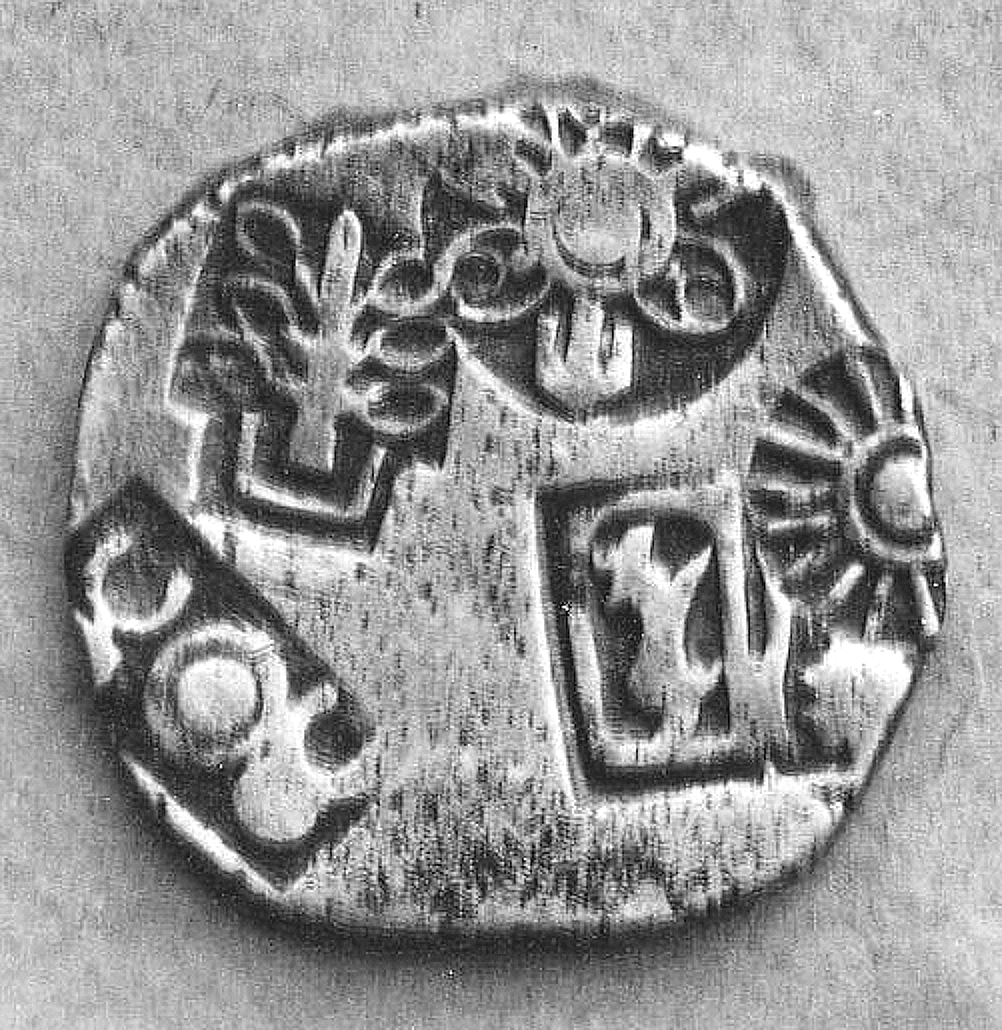
Mauryan punched mark coin found inside the Vajrasana, Bodh Gaya

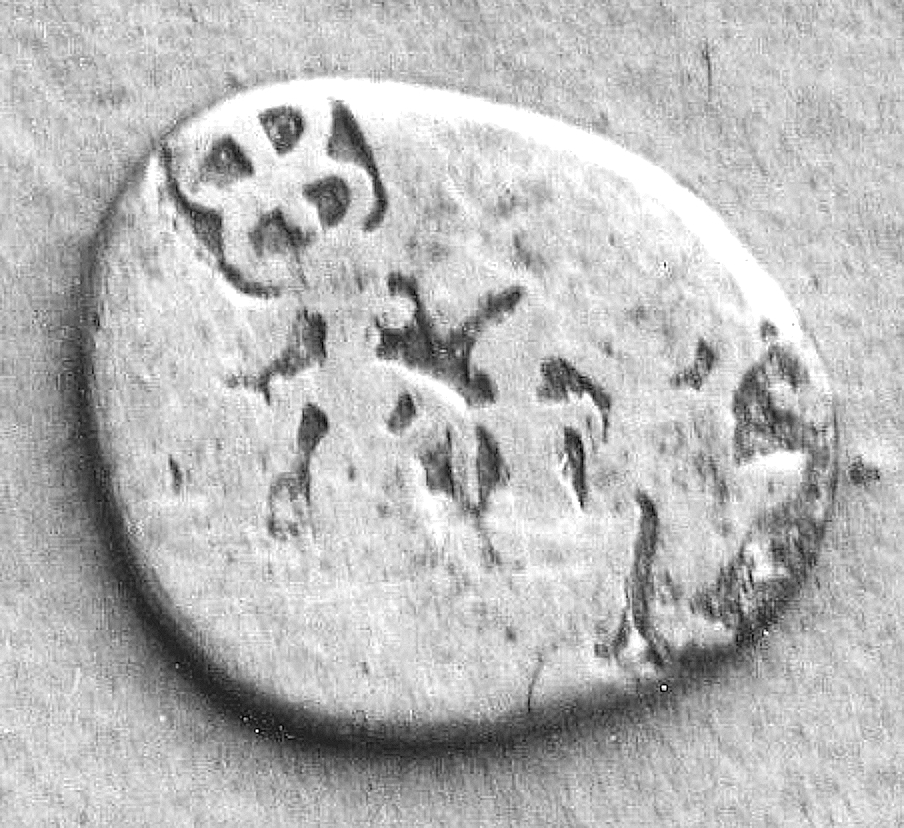
Mauryan punched mark coin found inside the Vajrasana, Bodh Gaya

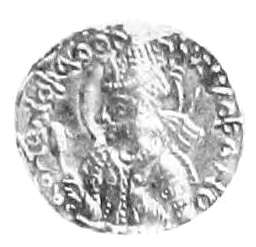
Huvishka coin found inside the Vajrasana

== See also ==
- Pillars of Ashoka
- Hellenistic influence on Indian art
