= Antefix =

Terminal block for the covering tiles of a roof

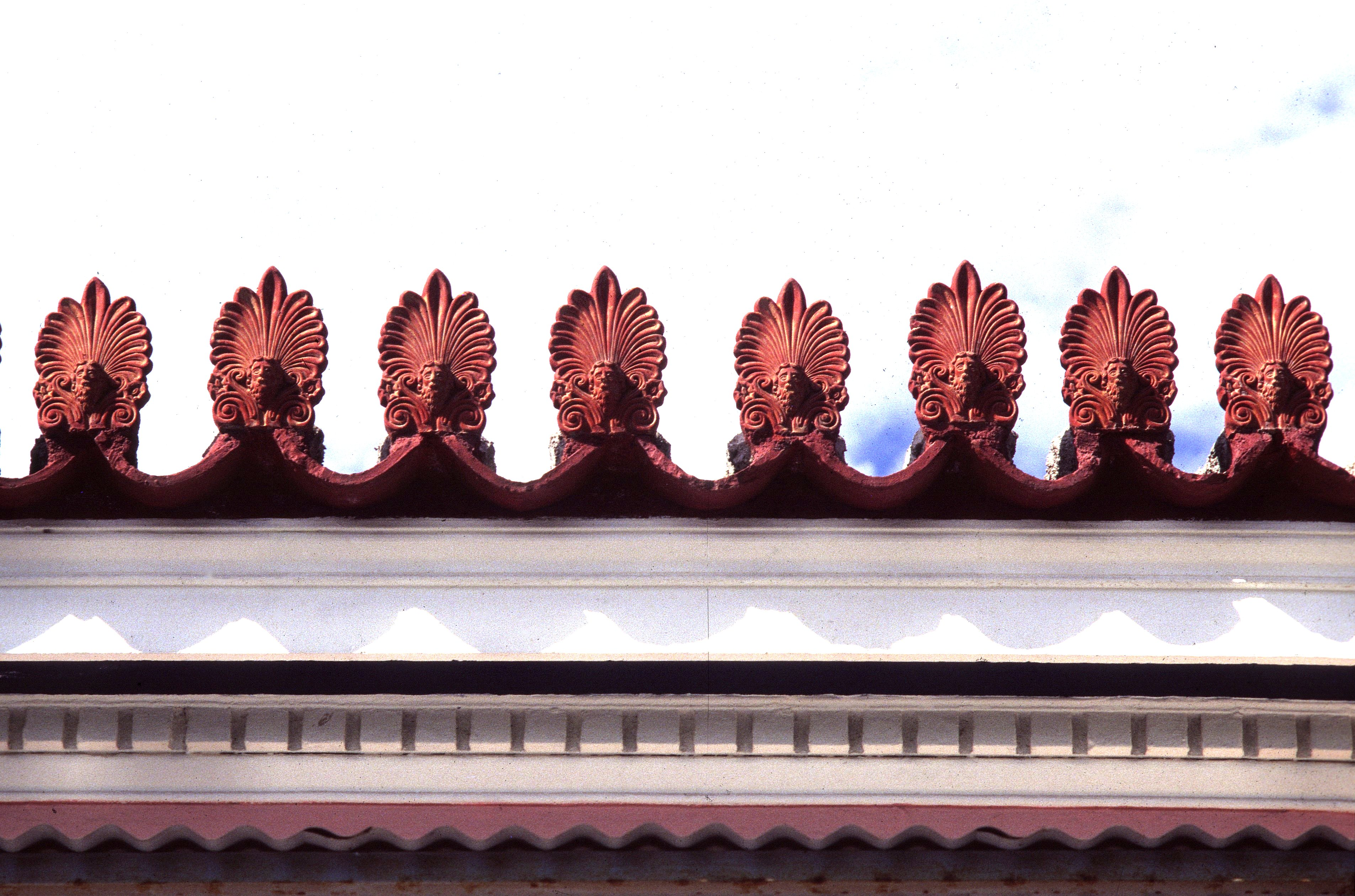
Reproduction antefixes with anthemia, Athens

In architecture, an antefix (from Latin antefigere 'to fasten before') is a vertical block which terminates and conceals the covering tiles of a tiled roof (see imbrex and tegula, monk and nun). It also serves to protect the join from the elements. In grand buildings, the face of each stone antefix was richly carved, often with the anthemion ornament. In less grand buildings moulded ceramic antefixes, usually terracotta, might be decorated with figures heads, either of humans, mythological creatures, or astrological iconography, especially in the Roman period. On temple roofs, maenads and satyrs were often alternated. The frightening features of the Gorgon, with its petrifying eyes and sharp teeth, was also a popular motif to ward off evil. A Roman example from the Augustan period features the butting heads of two billy goats. It may have had special significance in imperial Rome since the constellation Capricorn was adopted by the emperor Augustus as his own lucky star sign and appeared on coins and legionary standards. By this time they were found on many large buildings, including private houses. The earliest examples in museum collections date back to the 7th century BCE in both Greece and Etruria.

In the garden of the Villa Giulia in Rome, that houses the National Etruscan Museum, is a reconstruction of an Etruscan temple built between 1889 and 1890 on the basis of the ruins found in Alatri. Its tiled roof is lined with antefixes.

== Etymology ==
From Latin antefixa, pl. of antefixum, something fastened in front, from antefixus, fastened in front: ante-, ante- and fixus, fastened, past participle of figere, to fasten.

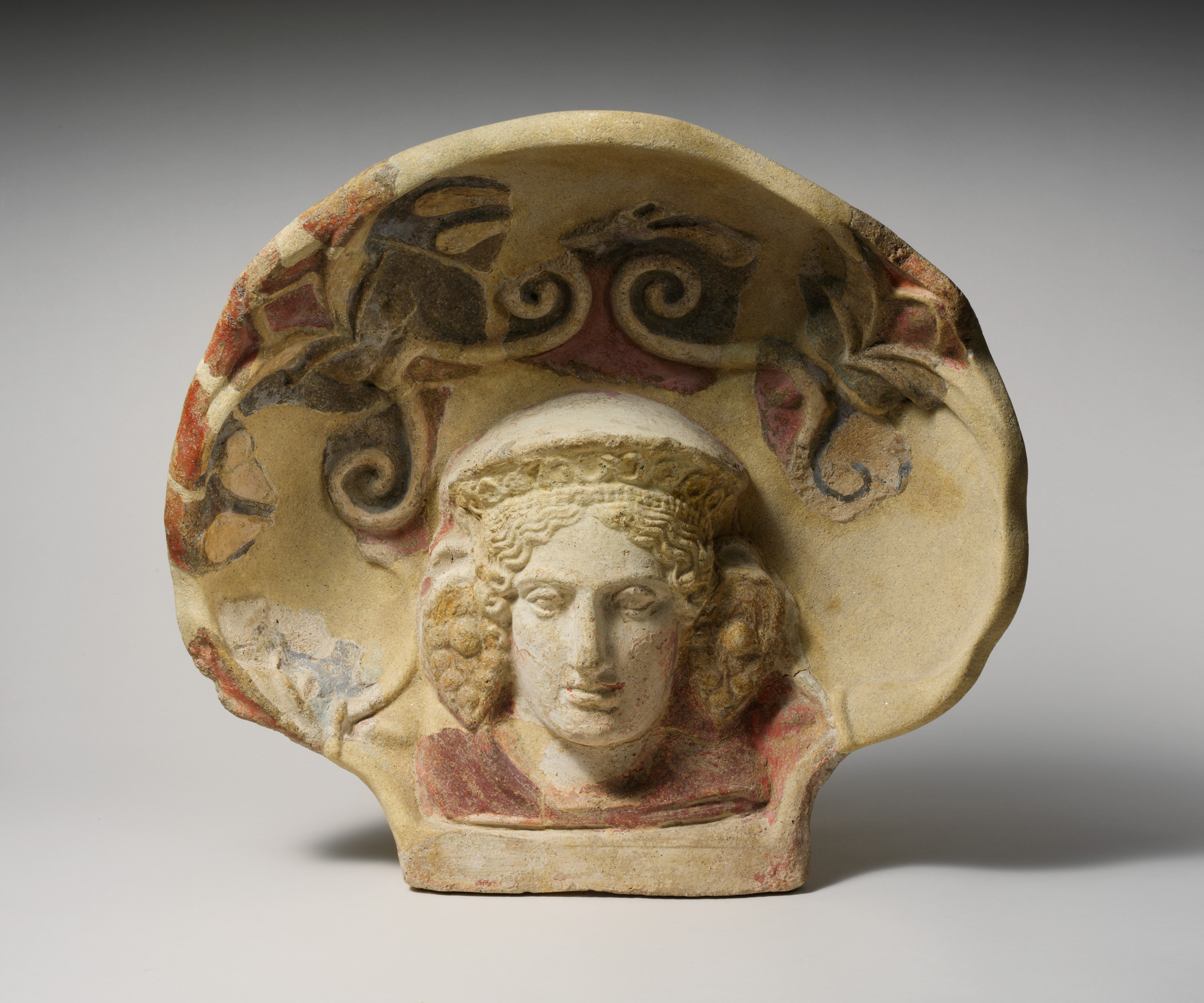
Etruscan antefix from Cerveteri of a maenad wearing an elaborate diadem and grape-cluster earrings, The MET

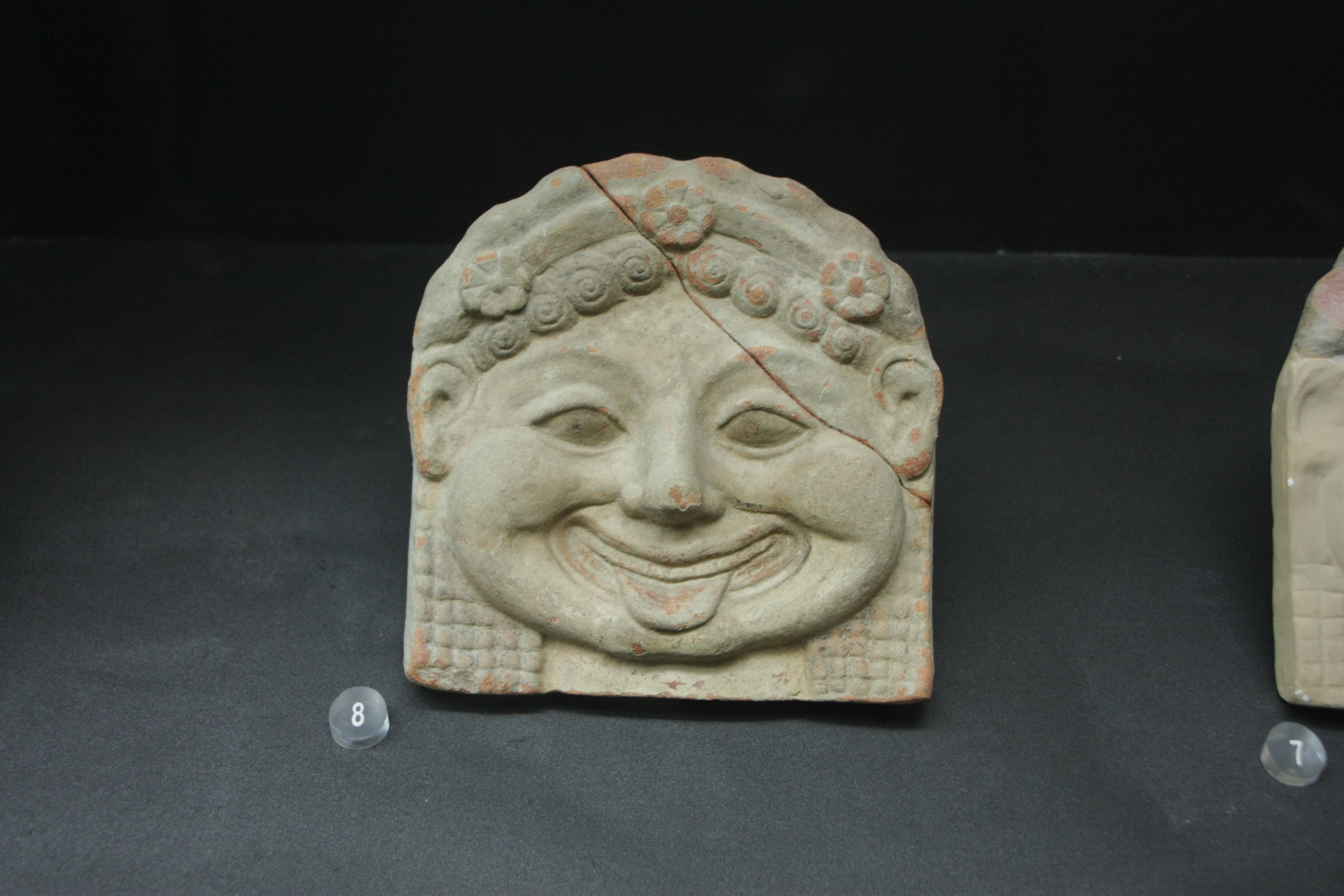
Greek antefix depicting a Gorgon, 6st century BCE, Regional Archeological Museum, Gela, Italy

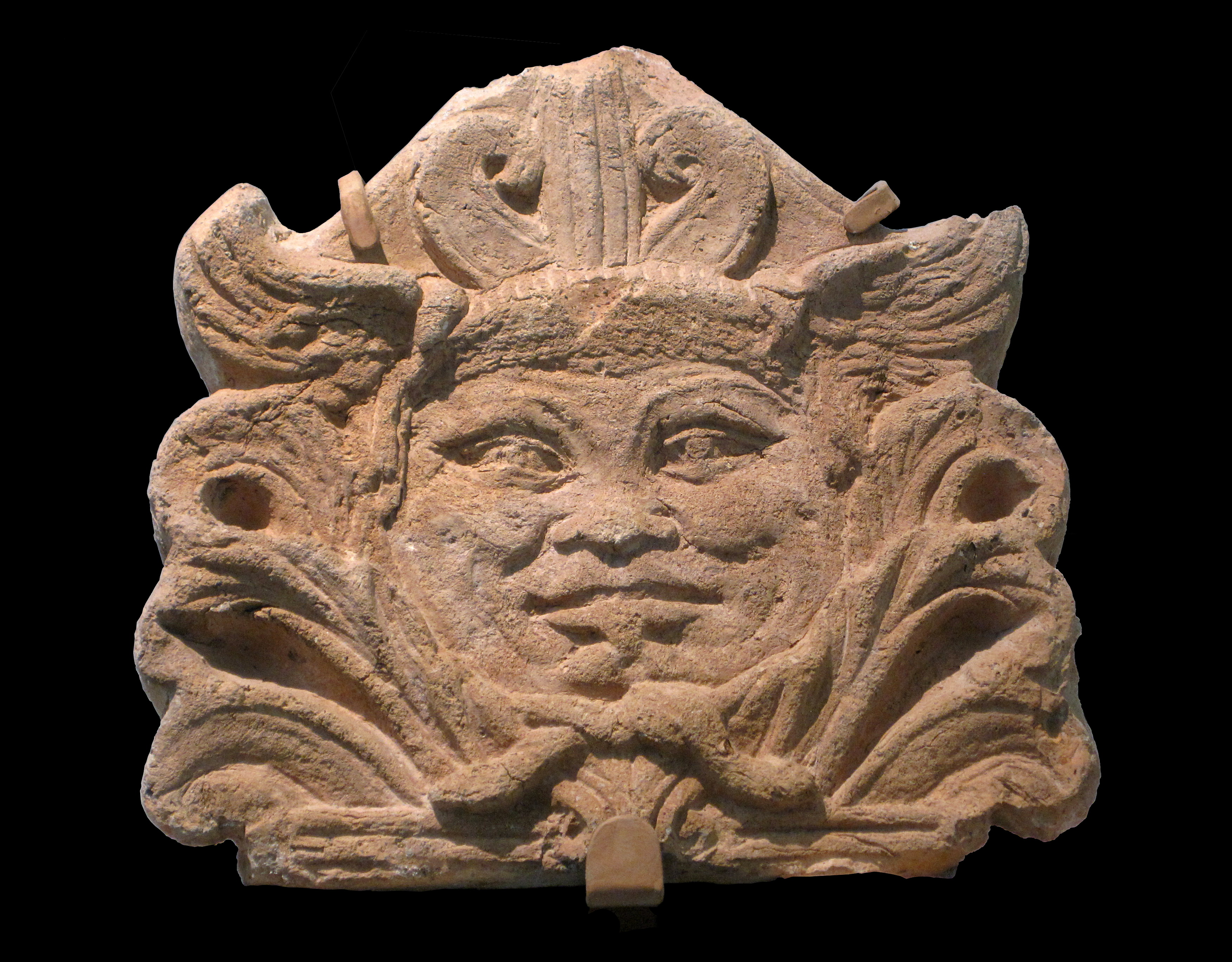
Etruscan antefix from Vulci, 1st century BCE, Vatican City

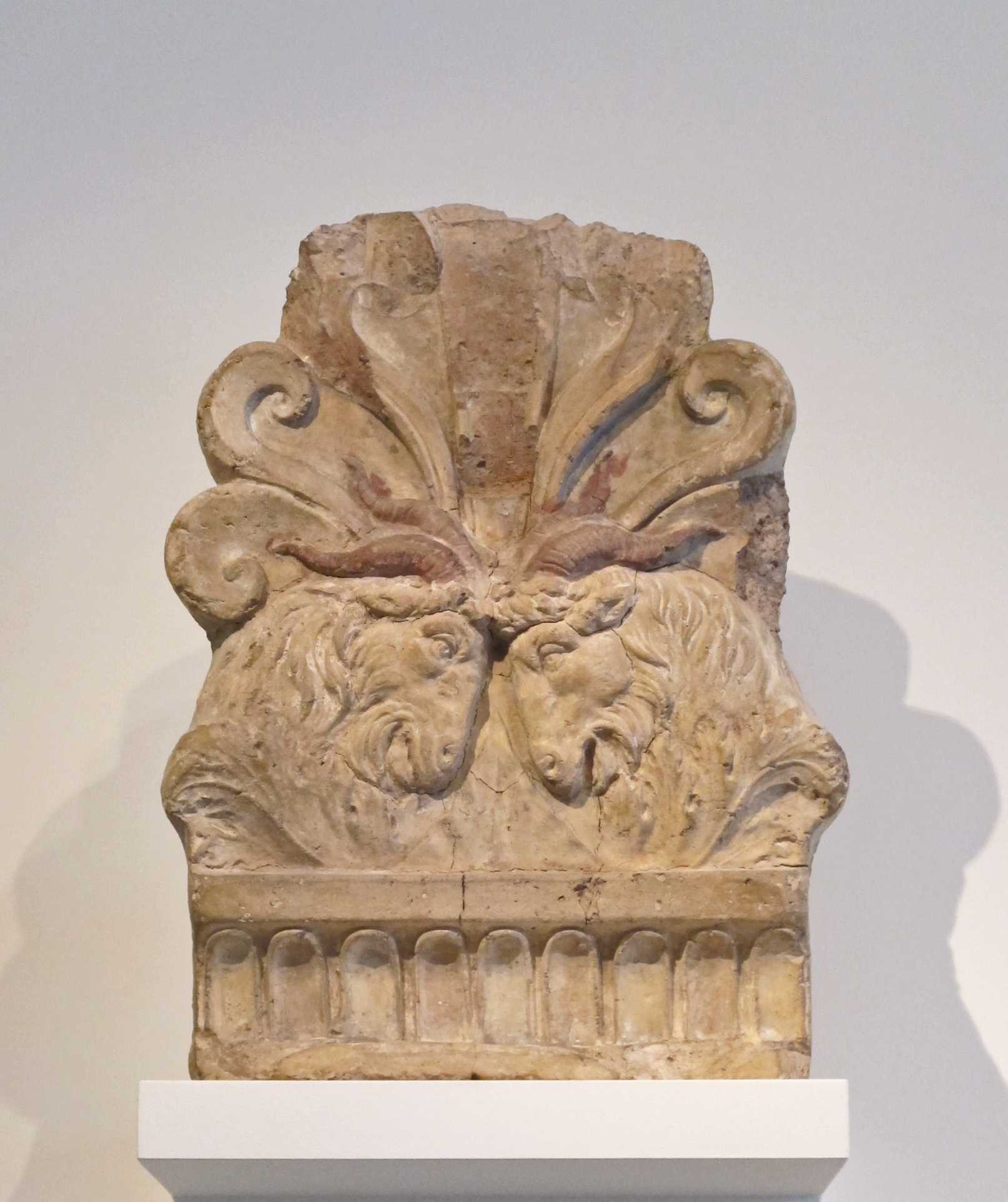
Roman antefix decorated with the butting heads of two billy goats, The MET

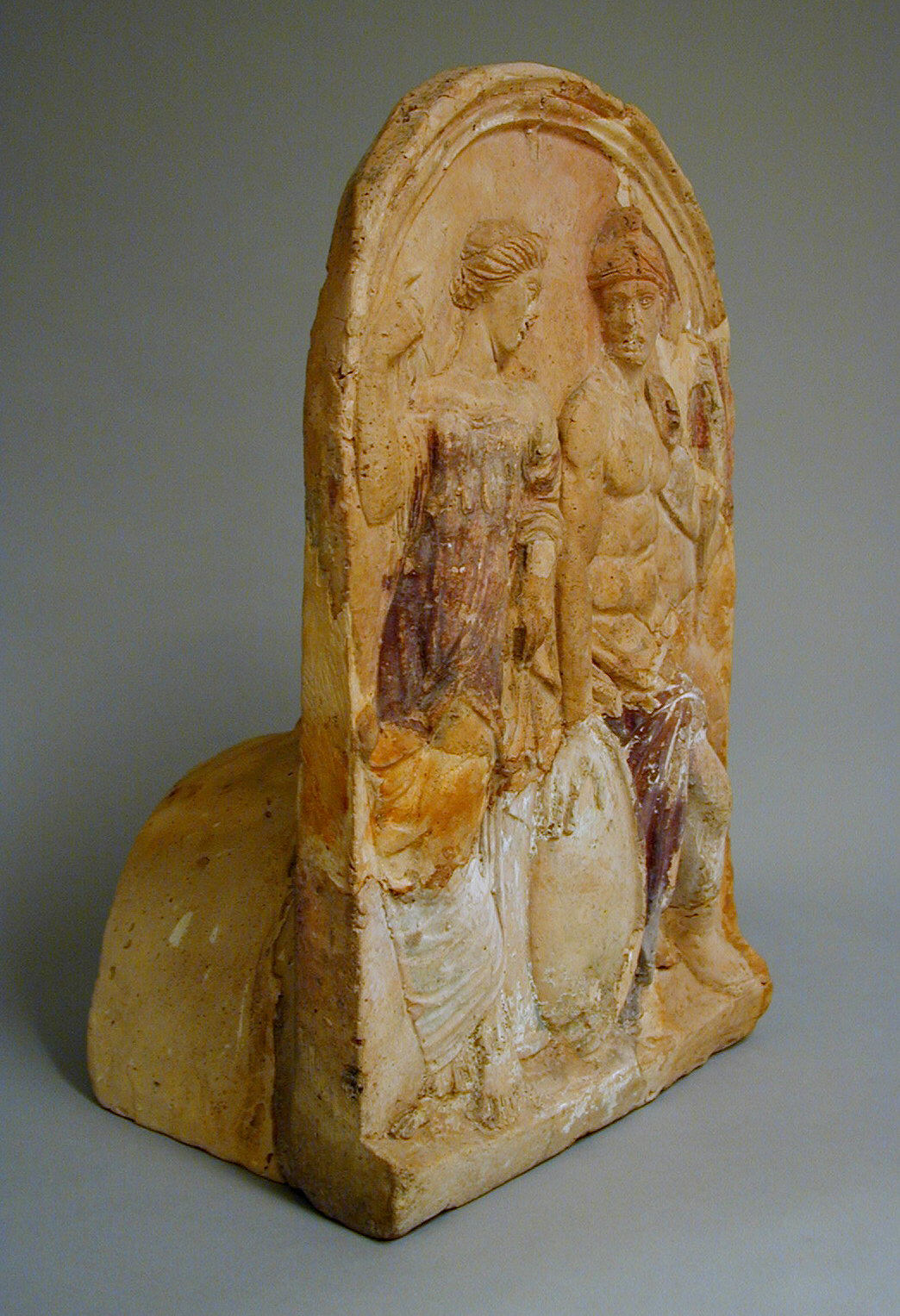
Roman antefix depicting Venus (Aphrodite, the goddess of love) and her lover Mars (Ares, the god of war), The MET

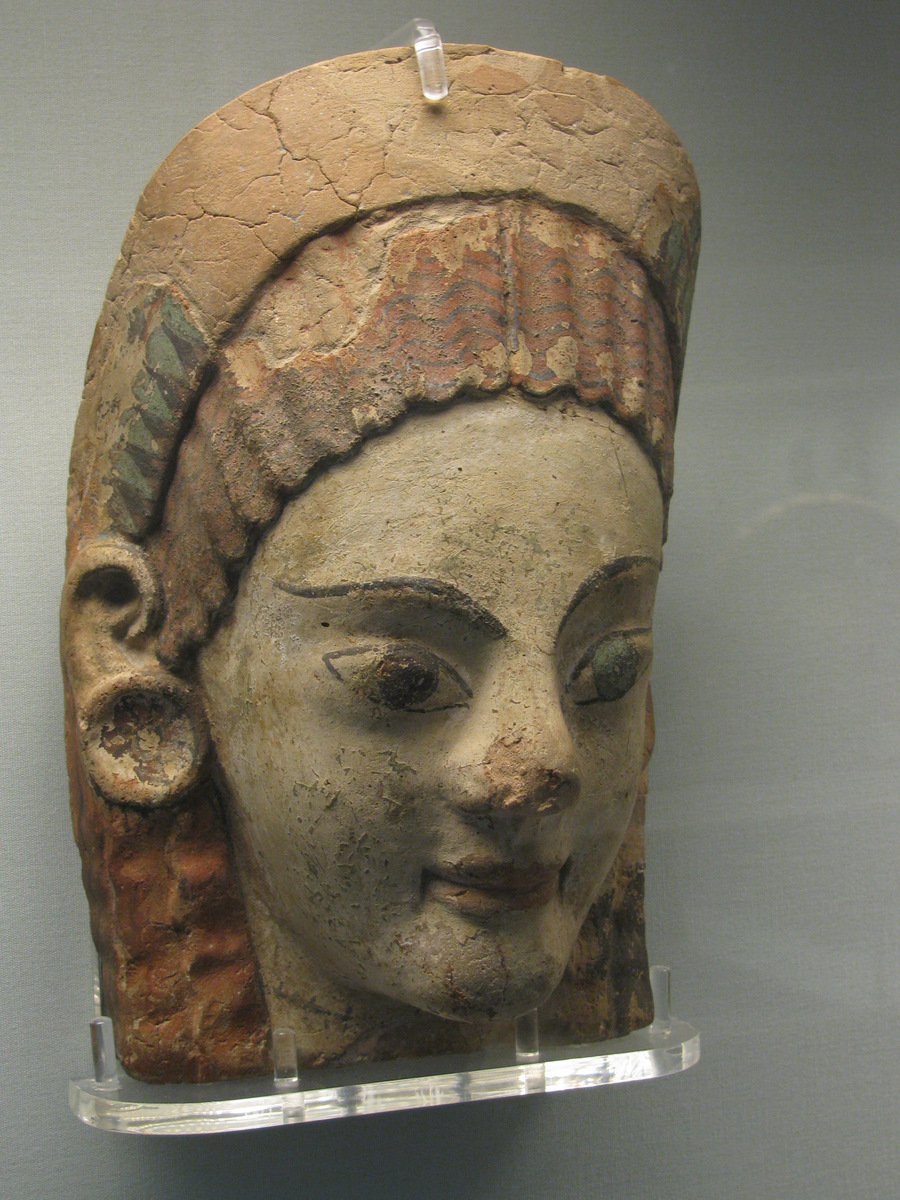
Etruscan antefix from Cerveteri, 6th century BCE, British Museum, London

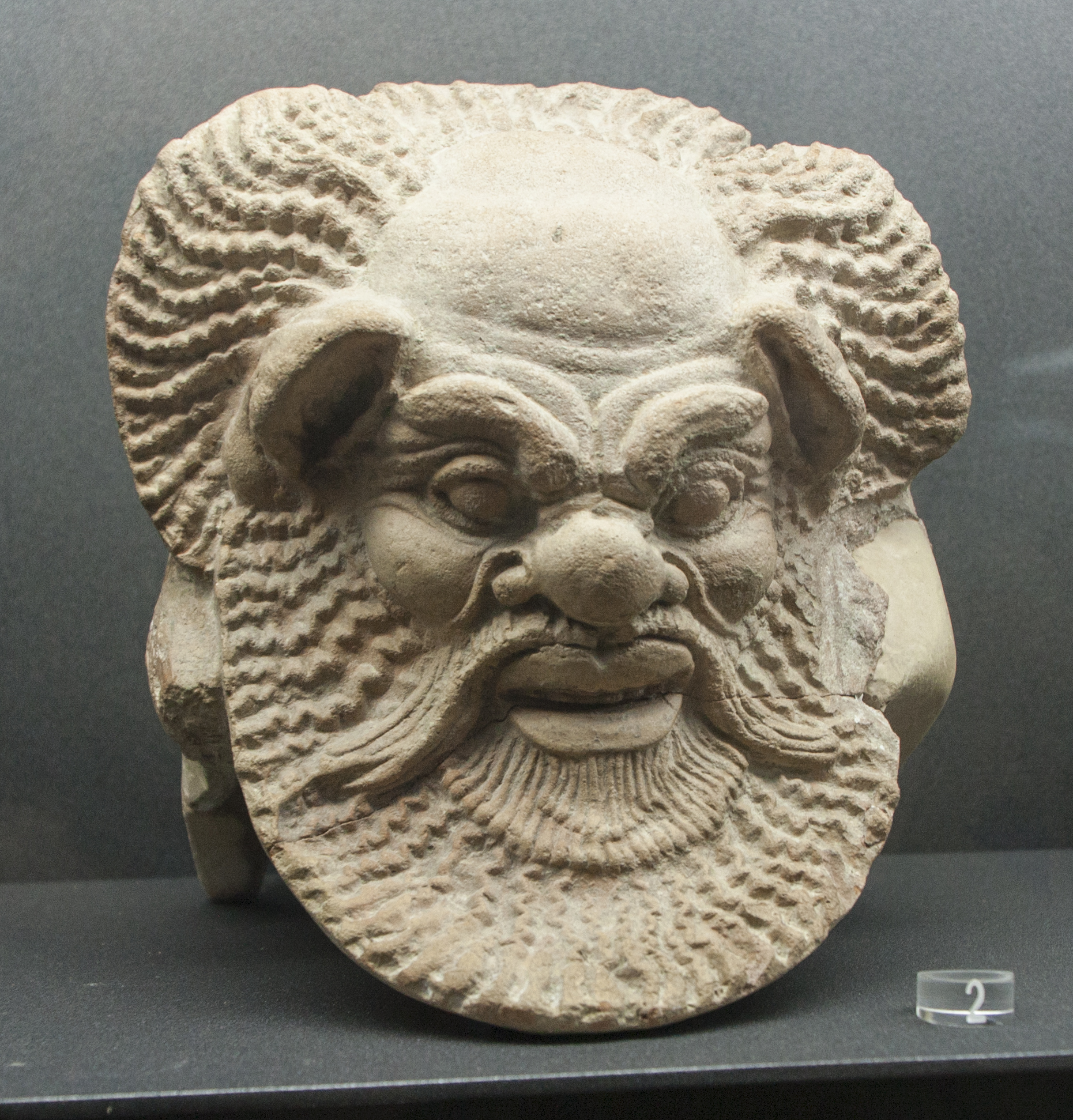
Greek antefix depicting Silenus. Regional Archeological Museum, Gela, Italy

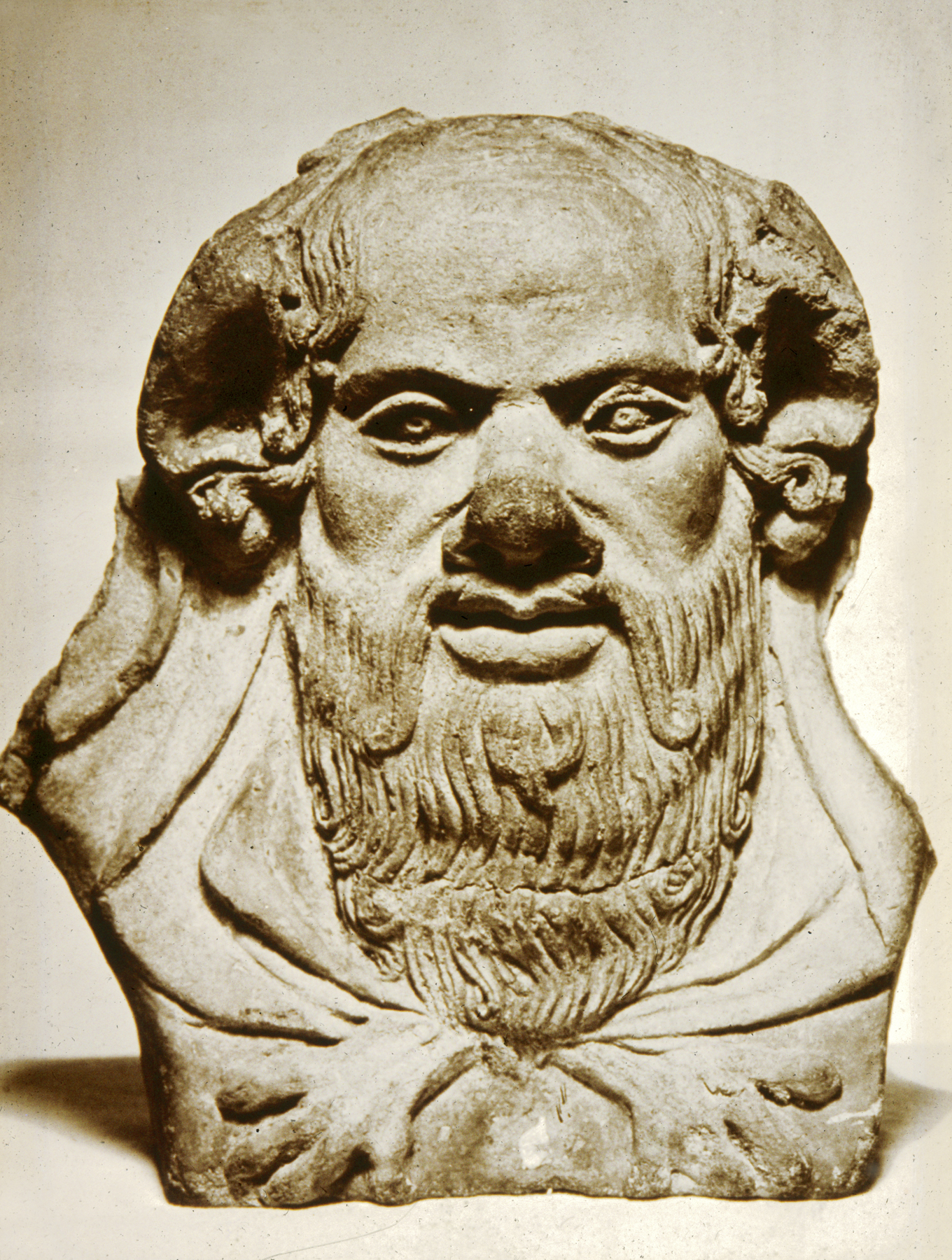
Etruscan antefix depicting Silenus. Walters Art Museum, Baltimore, Maryland

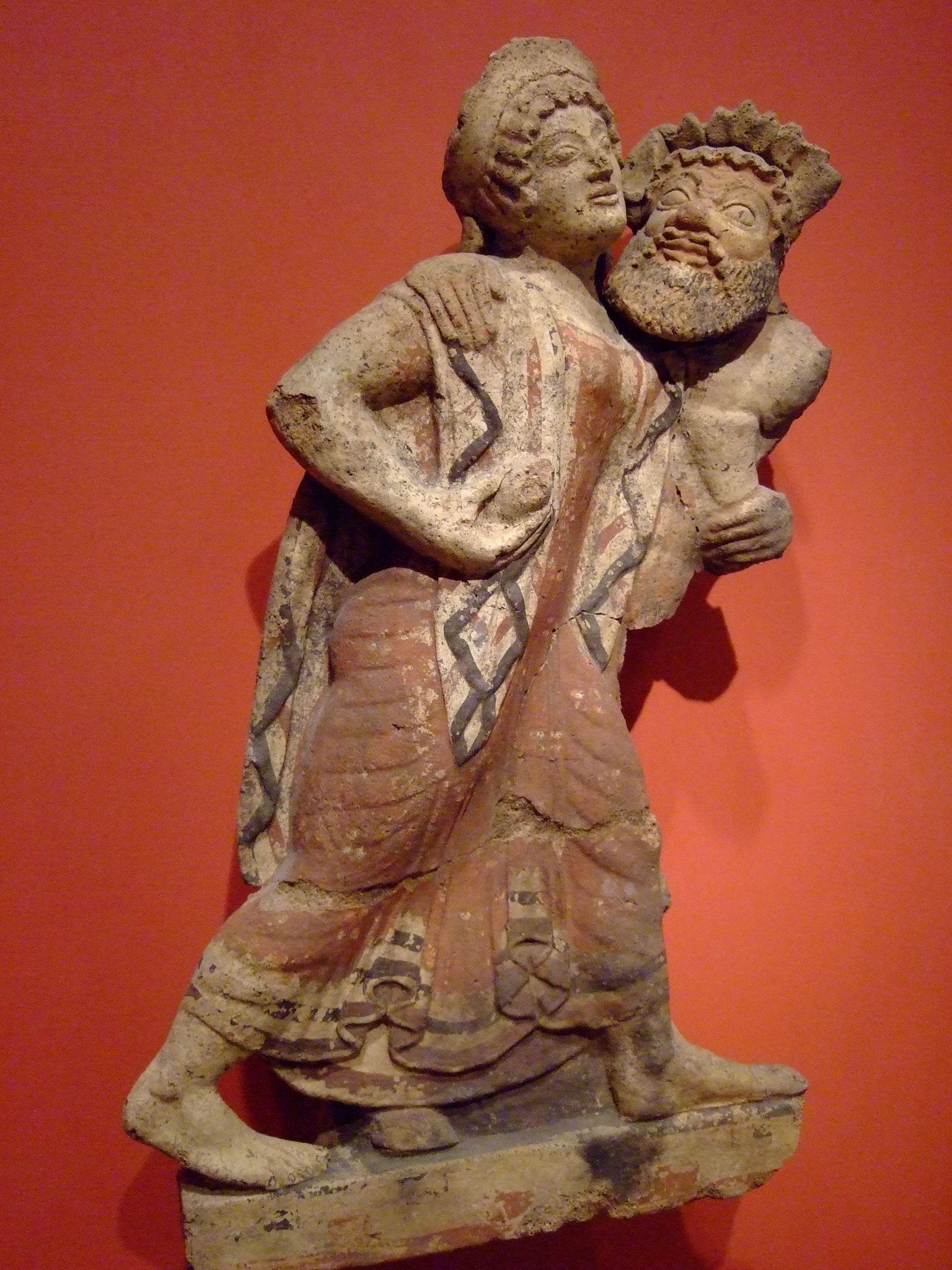
Etruscan antefix depicting a dancing Maenad and a Satyr, 500–475 BCE, Getty Villa, Los Angeles, California

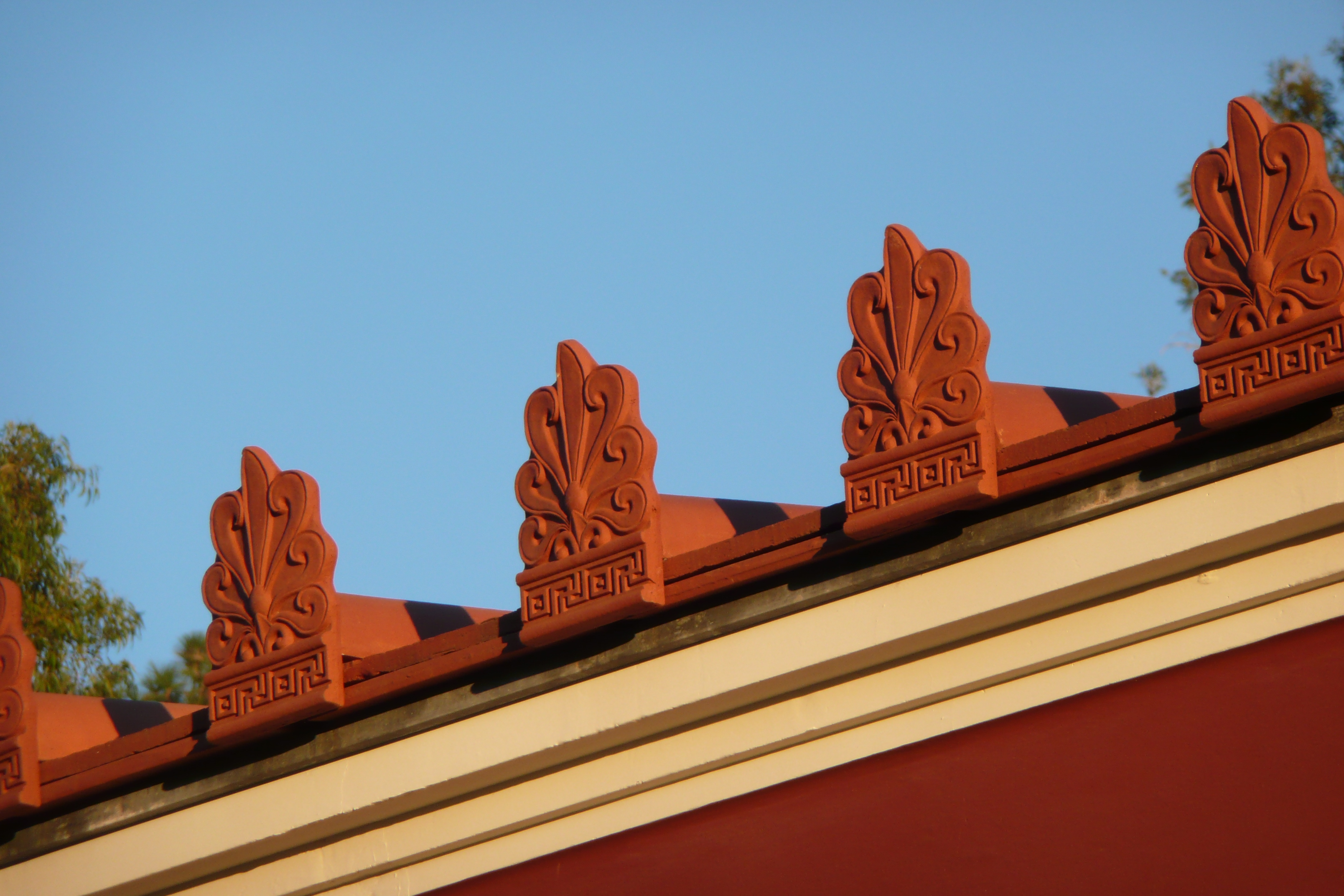
Antefixes in position, Getty Villa, Los Angeles, California
